= List of compositions by Otar Taktakishvili =

This is a list of compositions by Otar Taktakishvili.

== List of works ==
Hymn of the Georgian SSR (1946)
Text: A. Abasheli and G. Abashidze.
Cello Concerto No. 1 in D minor (1947)
In three movements.
Symphony No. 1 Youth Symphony in A minor for full symphony orchestra (1949)
In four movements:
1. Andante
2. Andante
3. Allegro scherzando
4. Moderato
Orchestra: 3(picc.),3(E.H.),3,2 – 4,3,3,1 – kettledrums, side drum, cymbals, bass drum, chime bells – xyl – harp, pf – strings.
First performance in 1949 in Tbilisi.
LP Melodiya D 02348-: Radio Orchestra, Dimitriady (cond)
Samgori, symphonic poem (1950)
Piano Concerto No. 1 in C minor (1950)
In four movements:
1. Allegro
2. Scherzo. Vivo e leggiero
3. Andante
4. Finale. Allegro molto
Orchestra: 3(picc.),2(E.H.),2,2 – 4,3,3,1 – kettledrums, cymbals – strings.
First performance: 15 November 1951 in Tbilisi.
Video:
- (Movement 1 & 2) Moscow PO, Dong Hymn (cond), Jungram Khwarg (piano)
- (Movement 3 & 4) Moscow PO, Dong Hymn (cond), Jungram Khwarg (piano)
LP Melodiya D 0420-1: USSR State Orchestra, Stasevich (cond), A. Jokheles (piano)
LP Melodiya C10 10115-16: Central TV and Radio Large SO, O. Taktakishvili (cond), M. Mdivani (piano)
CD Cambria Recordings CD-1120: Moscow PO, Dong Hymn (cond), Jungram Khwarg (piano) (Release: 2000)
Three Pieces for Piano (1951)
Poem
The Prisoner for piano (1951)
Festive Overture for symphony orchestra (1951)
Symphony No. 2 in C minor for full symphony orchestra (1953)
In four movements:
1. Andante. Allegro appassionato
2. Vivo
3. Adagio.
4. Moderato
Orchestra: 3(picc.),3(E.H.),3,2 – 4,3,3,1 – kettledrums, triangle, side drum, cymbals, bass drum, tam-tam – xyl – harp, pf – strings.
First performance in 1953 in Tbilisi.
LP Melodiya D 03756-7: USSR State Orchestra, K. Ivanov (cond)
CD Russian Disc RDCD 00768: Academic Symphony Orchestra, Y. Svetlanov (cond) (rec: 1992)
Elegy, symphonic miniature (1954)
Sachidao, symphonic miniature (1954)
Orchestra: 2,3(E.H.),3,2 – 4,3,3,1 – kettledrums, – harp – strings.
Shairi, symphonic miniature (1954)
Trumpet Concerto (1954)
Seven Romances after Vazha Pshavela for tenor and piano (1955)
Russian text by L. Ozerov.
First performance in 1957 in Tbilisi.
Seven Romances after Georgian Poets for singer and piano (1956)
Five Vocal Poems after G. Tabidze for mezzo-soprano, soprano and orchestra (1956)
LP Melodiya D 011027-8: Moscow PO, K. Kondrashin (cond), M. Preobrazhenskaya (soprano), N. Postavnicheva (mezzo-soprano)
LP Melodiya D 025643-6: Moscow PO, K. Kondrashin (cond), M. Preobrazhenskaya (soprano), N. Postavnicheva (mezzo-soprano)
LP Melodiya C10 09847-48: Moscow PO, K. Kondrashin (cond), M. Preobrazhenskaya (soprano), N. Postavnicheva (mezzo-soprano)
LP Melodiya: Georgian Philharmonic Chamber Orchestra, O. Taktakishvili (cond), T. Tatishvili (soprano), N. Tugushi (mezzo-soprano)
Mtsyri, symphonic poem (1956)
Based on M. Lermontov’s poem.
Orchestra: 3(picc.),3(E.H.),3,2 – 4,3,3,1 – kettledrums, side drum, cymbals, bass drum, tam-tam, chime bells – xyl – cel, harp – strings.
First performance in 1956 in Tbilisi.
Video:
- USSR State Orchestra, O. Taktakishvili (cond)
LP Melodiya D 04944-5: USSR State Orchestra, O. Taktakishvili (cond)
LP Melodiya D 014283-4: USSR State Orchestra, O. Taktakishvili (cond)
Concertino in C major for violin and small orchestra (1956)
In three movements:
1. Allegretto
2. Andantino
3. Vivo
Orchestra: 2,2,1 – strings.
First performance in 1956 in Tbilisi.
Video:
- Moscow Radio Orchestra, O. Taktakishvili (cond), D. Oistrakh (violin)
LP Melodiya D 04944-5: Moscow Radio Orchestra, O. Taktakishvili (cond), D. Oistrakh (violin)
LP Melodiya D 014283-4: Moscow Radio Orchestra, O. Taktakishvili (cond), D. Oistrakh (violin)
LP Melodiya C10 08017-18: Moscow Radio Orchestra, O. Taktakishvili (cond), D. Oistrakh (violin)
O Tblisi, cantata (1958)
Five Vocal Poems for mezzo-soprano, violin and piano (or orchestra) (1958)
Revised version of Five Vocal Poems after G. Tabidze for mezzo-soprano, soprano and orchestra (1956).
Lyrics by Galaktion Tabidze; Russian text by E. Alexandrova.
1. Prayer
2. Me and the night
3. The city was howling like an enraged beast
4. Evening
5. The moon over Mtatsminda
First performance in 1958 in Tbilisi.
Five Vocal Poems for mezzo-soprano, mezzo-soprano and piano (1960)
Revised version of Five Vocal Poems for mezzo-soprano, violin and piano (or orchestra) (1958).
Our Swallows to words by I. Abashidze (1960)
Mindia, opera in three acts (1960-1961)
Based on the Vazha Pshavela's poems.
Libretto by R. Tabukashvili and O. Taktakishvili.
Russian text by E. Alexandrova.
First performance: 23 July 1961 in Tbilisi.
Revised in 1971.
LP Melodiya D 013299-302: Tbilisi State Theatre Opera & Ballet Chorus and Orchestra, Dimitriady (cond), V. Chlunchadze (tenor), M. Amiranashvili (mezzo-soprano), P. Amiranasvili (baritone), T. Laperashvili (bass), I. Shushaniya (bass), G. Sagaradze
LP Melodiya D 012553-6: Radio Chorus and Orchestra, Dimitriady (cond), Z. Andzhaparidze (tenor), P. Amiranashvili (baritone), O. Koznetsova (soprano), I. Shushaniya (bass)
LP Melodiya C 0705-9: Radio Chorus and Orchestra, Dimitriady (cond), Z. Andzhaparidze (tenor), P. Amiranashvili (baritone), O. Koznetsova (soprano), I. Shushaniya (bass)
Humoresque for chamber orchestra (1961)
Orchestra: 2 flutes, clarinet; strings.
Simple Overture in C major for small symphony orchestra (1961)
Orchestra: 2,2,2,1 – 2,2,0,0 – kettledrums – strings.
Toccata for piano (1961-1962)
Seven Romances after Simon Tshikovani for soprano, baritone and piano (1962)
Six romances and a duet:
Nos. 1, 3 & 6 for soprano
Nos. 2, 5 & 7 for baritone
No. 4 for soprano and baritone.
Kesaneh to words by G. Leonidze (1962)
The Rock and the Stream, vocal–symphonic poem for mixed chorus and orchestra (1962)
To the words by V. Pshavela. Russian translation by G. Fere.
1. The Rock and the Stream
2. High-Flood and the Struggle with Rock
3. The Stream Wins
First performance in 1963 in Tbilisi.
Six Romances after Pushkin for tenor, bass and piano (1963)
The Live Hearth, oratorio for soprano, baritone, mixed chorus, and symphony orchestra (1964)
To the words by Simon Tshikovani.
Russian translation by E. Alexandrova and Khmaladze.
First performance in 1965 in Moscow.
LP Melodiya D 025001-2: Radio Chorus and Orchestra, O. Taktakishvili (cond), V. Budareva (soprano), A. Kleshcheva, S. Yakovenko (baritone)
Seven romances for tenor and bass with piano accompaniment (1965)
Lyrics by Alexander Pushkin.
In Rustaveli’s Footsteps (Solemn Chants), oratorio for bass, mixed chorus, symphony orchestra and organ (1963-1964)
To the words by I. Abashidze. Russian translation by G. Andreeva and A. Mezhirov.
Orchestra: 3(picc.),3(E.H.),3,3(dbsn) – 4,3,3,1 – kettledrums, side drum, cymb, bass drum, tam-tam, chime bells, bells – xyl – cel, 2 harps, pf, organ – strings.
First performance in 1965 in Moscow.
Movements:
1. Introduction
2. You Are Here
3. "Djvari", By the Walls of the Sacred Cross Monastery
4. "Vardzyia"
5. Palestina
6. The Native Language
7. The Exile
8. Tamara
9. Today Has Died Rustaveli
LP Melodiya D 018093: Moscow Large Chorus and Large Radio SO, G. Rozhdestvensky (cond), A. Vedernikov (bass), N. Gureyeva (organ)
LP Melodiya C 01315-6: Moscow Large Chorus and Loarge Radio SO, G. Rozhdestvensky (cond), A. Vedernikov (bass), N. Gureyeva (organ)
LP Melodiya D 019495-6: Georgian State Chorus and Orchestra, Khurodze (cond), T. Mushkudiany (bass)
Sonata for flute and piano in C major (1963-1966)
Movements:
1. Allegro cantabile
2. Aria: Moderato con moto
3. Allegro scherzando
Video:
- Fenwick Smith (flute), Randall Hodgkinson (piano)
- Elena Yakovleva (flute). Nina Botvinovskaya (piano)
- Manuela Wiesler (flute), Roland Pontinen (piano)
- Orchestration for flute and small orchestra by Olivier Kaspar:
  - Orchestre du Conservatoire à rayonnement régional de St Maur des fossés (France), Olivier Kaspar (cond), Philippe Lesgourgues (flute)
- CD BIS: Manuela Wiesler (flute), Roland Pontinen (piano)
Three Tales, operatic triptychon from three short operas (1967)
Libretto by the author after the stories by M. Dzhavakhishvili
1. Three Judgements" opera in one act
2. The Soldier, opera in one act
  S. Tsenin after G. Tabidze's poetry
3. Higher the Flags, opera in three pictures with an epilogue
Russian text by I. Arakishvili (No. 1), E. Alexandrova (No. 2):
1. Two Sentences
2. The Soldier (The Year 1905)
3. Banners Up!
First performance: 19 November 1967 in Tbilisi.
LP Melodiya D 025643-6: Radio Chorus and Orchestra, O. Taktakishvili (cond),
No. 1: V. Makhov (tenor), L. Kazanskaya (soprano), Y. Yakushev (baritone)
No. 2: S. Yakovenko (baritone), N. Postavnicheva (mezzo-soprano), V. Makohov (tenor), A. Tikhonov (bass)
No. 3: V. Selivanov (baritone), Y. Yelnikov (tenor)
The Sun has Vanished, poem (1967)
To words by G. Tabidze.
Russian translation by E. Alexandrova.
Twilight above Mtazminda, poem for tenor, men's octet, chorus and orchestra (1968)
Pieces for violin and piano (1968)
1. Melody
2. Rondo
Sonata for violin and piano (1969)
1. Allegro leggiero
2. Andante
3. Allegro molto.
Poem and Allegro for cello and piano (1969)
LP Melodiya D 300069-70: I. Cheisvily (cello), N. Tumanova (piano)
Piano Trio (1969)
Six Children's Pieces for piano (1969)
Native Tunes, five pieces for piano (1970)
Suite for piano:
1. Enguri
2. Svan Tower
3. Shairi (Limericks)
4. The Alazan Valley
5. March (Toccata)
Nikolas Baratashvili, oratorio for tenor, men's vocal octet, chorus and symphony orchestra (1970)
To lyrics by N. Baratashvili. Russian translation by G. Andreeva.
Orchestra: 3(picc.),3(E.H.),3,3(dbsn) – 4,4,3,1 – kettledrums, side drum, cymb, bass drum, tam-tam, chime bells, bells – xyl – cel, harp, pf – strings.
First performance in 1971 in Tbilisi.
LP Melodiya CM 04357-8: Moscow PO, Radio Chorus, "Gordela" Vocal Ensemble, O. Taktakishvili (cond), Z. Andzhaparidze (tenor)
Gurian Songs, cantata after Georgian folktexts for men's vocal octet, mixed chorus and symphony orchestra (1971)
Folk texts. Russian translation by G. Andreeva.
Orchestra: 3(picc.),3(E.H.),3,3(dbsn) – 4,3,3,1 – kettledrums, side drum, cymb, bass drum, tam-tam, chime bells, bells – xyl – cel, harp, pf – strings.
First performance in 1971 in Moscow.
CD Russian Disc RDCD 00768: USSR TV & Radio Symphony Orchestra, Vocal Ensemble, Otar Taktakishvili (cond), L. Belobragina (soprano)
Three Pieces for violin and piano (1971)
Three Lives (1971-1972)
Revised in 1972. New opera No. 3: Shikor after M. Dshavachishvili.
The second version of the Three Tales (1967)
1. Two Brothers
2. The Fate of a Soldier
3. Chikori
First performance: 9 September 1972 in Moscow.
Mengrelian Songs, suite for tenor, men's vocal octet and chamber orchestra (1972)
Free arrangements to traditional words. Russian translation by G. Andreeva.
Orchestra: flute, oboe, clarinet; snare drum, bells; strings.
First performance in 1973 in Leningrad.
LP Melodiya CM 04357-8: Radio Chorus and Orchestra, O. Taktakishvili (cond), L. Belobragina (soprano)
CD Russian Disc RDCD 00768: Leningrad Chamber Orchestra, "Rustavy" Vocal Ensemble, Otar Taktakishvili (cond), L. Gozman (tenor)
Piano Concerto No. 2 Mountain Tunes (1973)
In two movements:
1. Andante (in F Sharp Minor)
2. Allegro alla breve (in A minor/C major)
Orchestra: 3(picc.),3,3,3(dbsn) – 4,4,3,1 – kettledrums – strings.
First performance in 1973 in Leningrad).
LP Melodiya C10 08017-18: Bolshoi Theatre Orchestra, O. Taktakishvili (cond), E. Virsaladze (piano)
Imitation of Georgian Folk instruments, suite for piano (1973)
Suite in four movements:
1. Duduki
2. Dholi
3. Panduri
4. Salamuri
Love Songs Lyrical Songs, suite after M. Pozchishvili for soprano, tenor, men's vocal octet and chamber orchestra (1974)
Words by M. Potskhishvili and traditional.
First performance in 1974 in Riga.
Piano Concerto No. 3 Youth Concerto in F major (1974)
In one movement.
First performance in 1974 in Tbilisi.
LP Melodiya C10 09347-48: Georgian Chamber Orchestra, O. Taktakishvili (cond), Doibzhashvili (piano)
Choreografic Suite, ballet in one act of five parts
Libretto: G. Aleksidse. First performance: 1976 in Tbilisi.
Sonata for violin (1975)
Transcription of flutesonata (1966).
Violin Concerto No. 1 in F minor (1976)
In four movements:
1. Andante. Allegro moderato
2. Scherzo. Presto leggiero
3. Moderato cantabile
4. Finale. Allegro tranquillo e cantabile
Video:
- (Movement 1 & 2) Central TV and Radio Large SO, Otar Taktakishvili (cond), Liana Isakadze (violin)
- (Movement 3 & 4) Central TV and Radio Large SO, Otar Taktakishvili (cond), Liana Isakadze (violin)
LP Melodiya C10 10115-16: Central TV and Radio Large SO, Otar Taktakishvili (cond), Liana Isakadze (violin)
The Abduction of the Moon, opera in three acts (1976)
Based on the novel by K. Gamsakhurdia.
Verses by S. Nishnianidze. Russian translation by I. Maznin.
Libretto: O. Taktakischwili.
First performance 25 March 1977 in The Bolshoi Theatre of Moscow; Producer B. Pokrovsky.
Overture to the opera The Abduction of the Moon (1976)
First performance in 1981.
Summer Lightnings Aflame, cantata for mezzo-soprano, bass, mixed chorus, and symphony orchestra (1976)
To the lyrics by I. Abashidze and S. Nishniadze.
Russian translation by V. Krasnopolsky.
1. Summer Lightnings Aflame. Allegro moderato
2. A Mother’s Song of Peace. Andante moderato
3. At the Cenotaph. Andante con moto
4. The Vow.
5. Hymn to Labour. Allegro
Orchestra: 4(picc.),3(E.H.),0,3(dbsn) – 4,4,3,1 – kettledrums, snare drum, cymb, bass drum – harp, pf – strings – jazz band – 6 trumpets (in B flat).
First performance in 1976 in Moscow.
Cello Concerto No. 2 in D major (1977)
In three movements:
1. Moderato
2. Andante
3. Andante
Video:
- Eldar Issakadze (cello), Otar Taktakishvili, conductor (1977)
To the Holy Shushanik, Georgian hymn for baritone, men's chorus and percussion instruments (1979)
LP Melodiya: Academic Men's Chorus of the Estonian SSR, O. Taktakishvili (cond)
Mususi (The Lady Killer), comic opera in one act after M. Dshawachishvili (1977-1980)
Based on M. Dzhavakhishvili's story.
Verses by M. Tarkhnishvili. Russian translation by P. Gradov.
Libretto: O. Taktakishvili.
First performance in 1978 in Tbilisi.
Dance Suite, three dances from the opera Mususi for symphony orchestra (1978)
1. Slow Dance
2. Georgian Dance
3. Fete in Kartli
Secular Hymns for soloists, men's chorus, kettledrums, bells and two harps (1979)
Dedication to St. Shushanik.
To the words by Demetre (12th century), Shota Rustaveli, Simon Chikovani and traditional.
Russian translation by M. Pavlova.
Dedicated to Gustav Ernesax.
First performance in 1979 in Tbilisi.
First Love, comic opera in two acts (1980)
Libretto: R. Gabriadze, based on his story “The Wondrous Bird”.
First performance: 30 December 1980 in Tbilisi.
Overture to the opera First Love (1980)
Concert version for symphony orchestra.
Six Romances for mezzo-soprano with piano accompaniment to words by Alexander Pushkin (1980)
Six Children's Pieces for piano (1980)
1. Song
2. March
3. Riddle
4. It has Stopped Raining
5. A Little Box
6. Waltz
Five Lullabies for women's chorus a capella to folk words (1980)
First performance in 1980 in Tbilisi.
Festivities in Georgia, dance suite for symphony orchestra (1980)
1. Allegro marciale
2. Marciale maestoso
First performance in 1980 in Moscow.
Orchestral Miniatures for symphony orchestra (1980)
1. Larghetto
2. Intermezzo
3. March
4. Mountaineers’ Dance
Kartalin Tunes, choral cycle for women's chorus a’capella to folk words (1982)
Piano Concerto No. 4 in D minor for piano and chamberorchestra (1983)
In four movements:
1. Allegro non troppo
2. Allegro vivo
3. Andante con moto
4. Allegro
Eight Romances on text by Nikoloz Baratashvili (1984)
With Tsereteli's Lyre, oratorio for soloists, mixed chorus, piano, flute, harp, and kettledrums (1984)
To the words by A. Tsere.
String Quartet in C minor (1983-1985)
Sonata for piano (1985)
Quintet for piano and string quartet (1986)
Violin Concerto No. 2 for violin and chamberorchestra (1986)
Movements:
1. Allegro moderato
2. Andante
3. Finale. Allegro molto
Video:
- Georgia Chamber Orchestra, L. Issakadze (conductor & violin)
CD Orfeo C 304 921 A: Georgia Chamber Orchestra, L. Issakadze (conductor & violin)
Twenty-Three Water-Colours for piano (1987)
Humoresque for two pianos (1987)
LP Melodiya C10 14241-2: M. Paniashvili and M. Altunashvili (piano)
Chamber Oratorio for men's chorus, soloists, piano, organ, and trumpet (1987)
Words by Queen Tamara, I. Chavchavadze, A. Kalandadze.

=== Various works ===
- Chamber music
- Music to Films
- Music to the Play "Vassa Shelesnova" after Gorki
- Music to the Play "King Oedipus" after Sophocles
- Music to the Play "Wintertale" after Shakespeare
- Orchestral works
- Romances
- Suites for piano
- Works for chorus

== Note ==
Musoussi = The Lady Killer (1976) Anatoli Levin conducting the Moscow Musical Chamber Theater Orchestra, recorded in 1981 2 LP set Catalog Melodiya C10-19113 008 (released in 1982)
