= Inkeri Lehtinen =

Finnish politician (1908–1997)

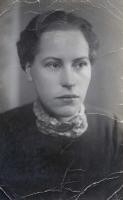

Minister of Education
- In office December 1939 – March 1940
- Prime Minister: Otto Wille Kuusinen
- Preceded by: Office established
- Succeeded by: Office abolished

Personal details
- Born: 7 March 1908 Helsinki
- Died: 1 March 1997 (aged 88) Helsinki
- Party: Communist Party of Finland

Inkeri Lehtinen (1908–1997) was a Finnish communist politician. She served as the education minister of the Terijoki government during the Finnish Democratic Republic. She was among the significant Finnish women politicians during the post-World War II period.

== Biography ==
Lehtinen was born in Helsinki on 7 March 1908. Her parents were the supporters of the Marxist–Leninist ideology. Between 1925 and 1945 she held different posts in the Soviet Union and Finland. She was a member of the Communist Party of Finland being one of its leaders in the period 1939–1969. In the late 1930s she was among the contributors of a magazine entitled Soihtu published by a group of young left-wing figures who were removed from the Party in 1937. This group was headed by Mauri Ryömä. In her writings Lehtinen criticized Ryömä due to his closeness to the Finnish government. From December 1939 to March 1940 she was the minister of education in the Terijoki Government during the Winter War.

Lehtinen left Finland after the war and settled in the Soviet Union. She returned to Finland in October 1946. She was elected as a member of the political bureau of the Communist Party's central committee in April 1963.

Lehtinen died in Helsinki on 1 March 1997 after a long illness.
