= Alexander Abasheli =

Georgian poet and prose writer

- ალექსანდრე აბაშელი
- Born: Isaac Chochia (ისააკ ჩოჩია); August 15, 1884; Sachochio, Kutaisi Governorate, Russian Empire
- Died: September 27, 1954 (aged 70); Tbilisi, Georgian SSR, Soviet Union
- Occupation(s): Poet and prose writer

Alexander Abasheli (Georgian: ალექსანდრე აბაშელი) was a pen name of Isaac Chochia (ისააკ ჩოჩია) (August 15, 1884 – September 27, 1954), a Georgian poet and prose writer.

Born into a peasant family in Sachochio (now Abashispiri), near Abasha, he was involved in the 1905 Russian Revolution and was exiled to Solvychegodsk in 1906. Returning to Georgia in 1908, he wrote for local press and had his first lyrics published first in Russian, and then in Georgian. He came under the influence of then-fashionable trends of Symbolism, with his first collection of lyrics "The Smile of the Sun" (მზის სიცილი; 1913) being impregnated with what has been described by critics as the "cult of the Sun".

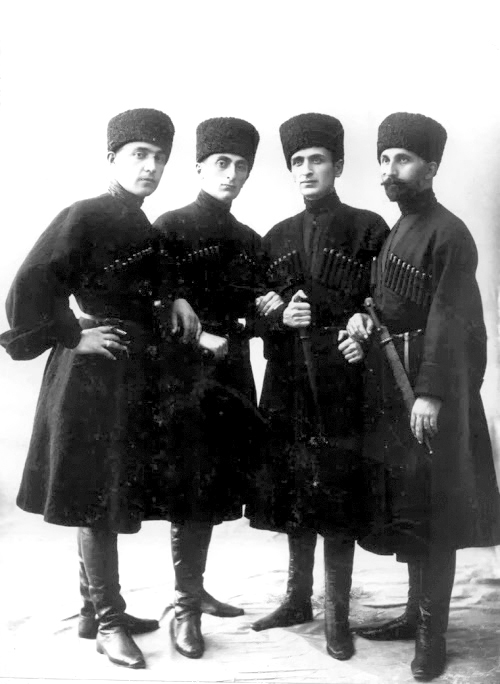
Carriers of black choh. Abasheli is the first one on the right

An outright hostility towards the Soviet regime established in Georgia in 1921 plunged his poetry into decadence characterized with the sense of hopelessness and disappointment in the revolutionary ideas of his youth. However, with the exacerbation of political repressions in the Soviet Union, Abasheli adopted a more conformist line and gradually became fully accommodated to the Soviet ideological dogmas to the point of collaborating with Grigol Abashidze in writing the original lyrics for the Anthem of the Georgian SSR which contained, among other things, a panegyric to Joseph Stalin.

Abasheli is also remembered as an author of the first Georgian science fiction novel "A Woman in the Mirror" (ქალი სარკეში; 1930). Several of his poems were translated into Russian by Boris Pasternak.
