= Petrozavodsk State University =

University in the Republic of Karelia, Russia

Coordinates: 61.7861°N 34.3528°E

- Петрозаводский государственный университет
- Type: Public
- Established: 1940
- Rector: Anatoly V. Voronin
- Students: 8824
- Doctoral students: 119
- Location: Petrozavodsk, Russia
- Website: petrsu.ru
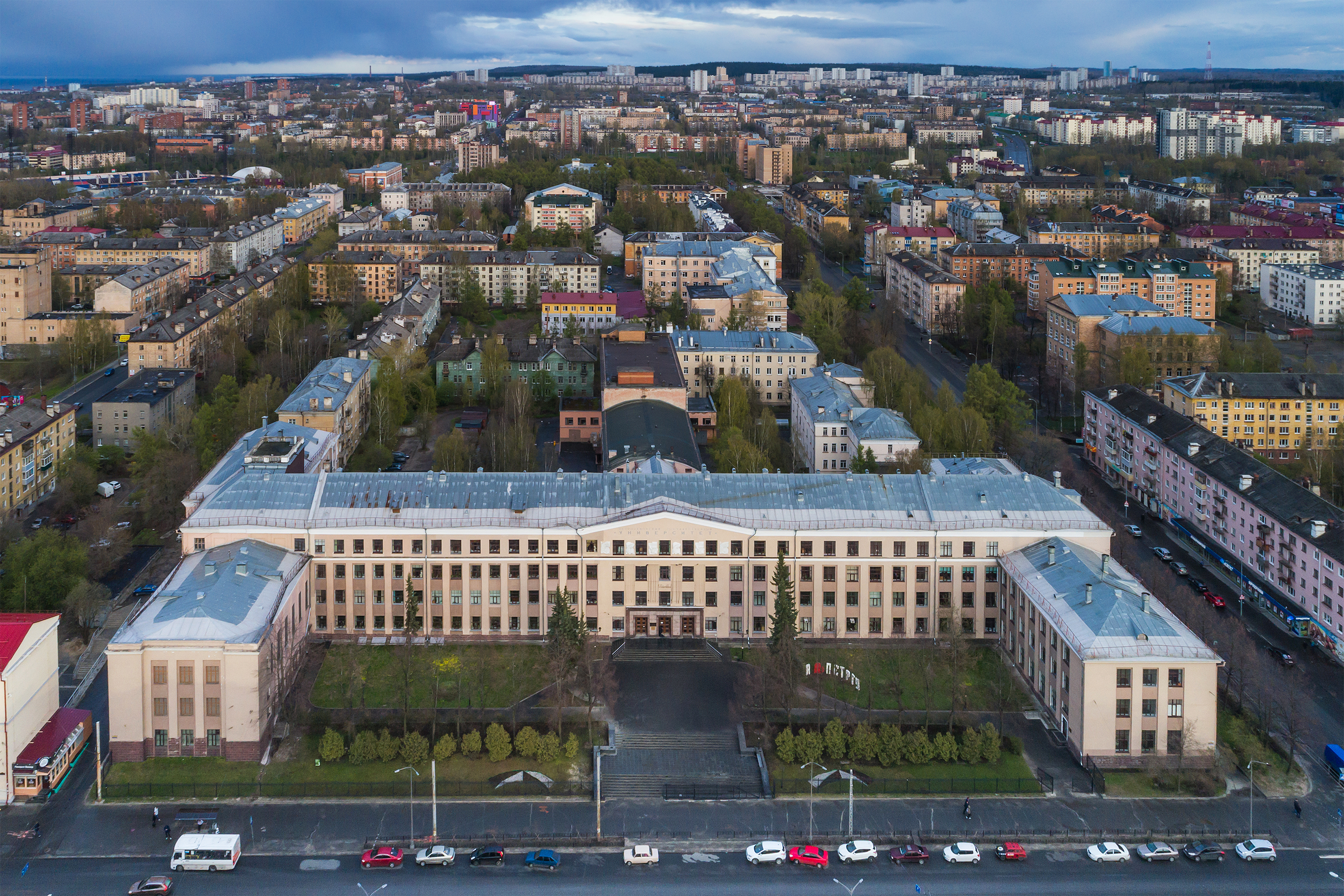

University rankings

Regional – Overall
- QS Emerging Europe and Central Asia: 301-350 (2022)

Petrozavodsk State University (PetrSU) is a classical university in Petrozavodsk, Republic of Karelia, Russia. It was founded in 1940 as the Karelian-Finnish University and was renamed in 1956 to Petrozavodsk State University. The rector of Petrozavodsk State University is Prof. Anatoly V. Voronin.

== General information ==
Petrozavodsk State University, 2017

There are 16 departments offering a range of disciplines. The university includes 10 faculties, 6 educational institutes, 79 departments, 84 laboratories, development and project departments, 27 innovative departments, 28 small enterprises, 2 techno parks, a publishing house, a scientific library, a botanical garden, and the "Onego" swimming pool.

PetrSU faculty numbers about 890 (105 doctors of science, 502 candidates of science, 66 professors, and 329 associate professors). More than 11,670 undergraduate and postgraduate students study at PetrSU.

Academic degrees and diplomas awarded: Bachelor of Science, Bachelor of Arts, Master of Science, Master of Arts, Doctor of Philosophy, Doctor of Science.

- Language of instruction: Russian.
- Language courses offered: Russian, English, Finnish, German, and French.

== History ==
=== Foundation of the University ===
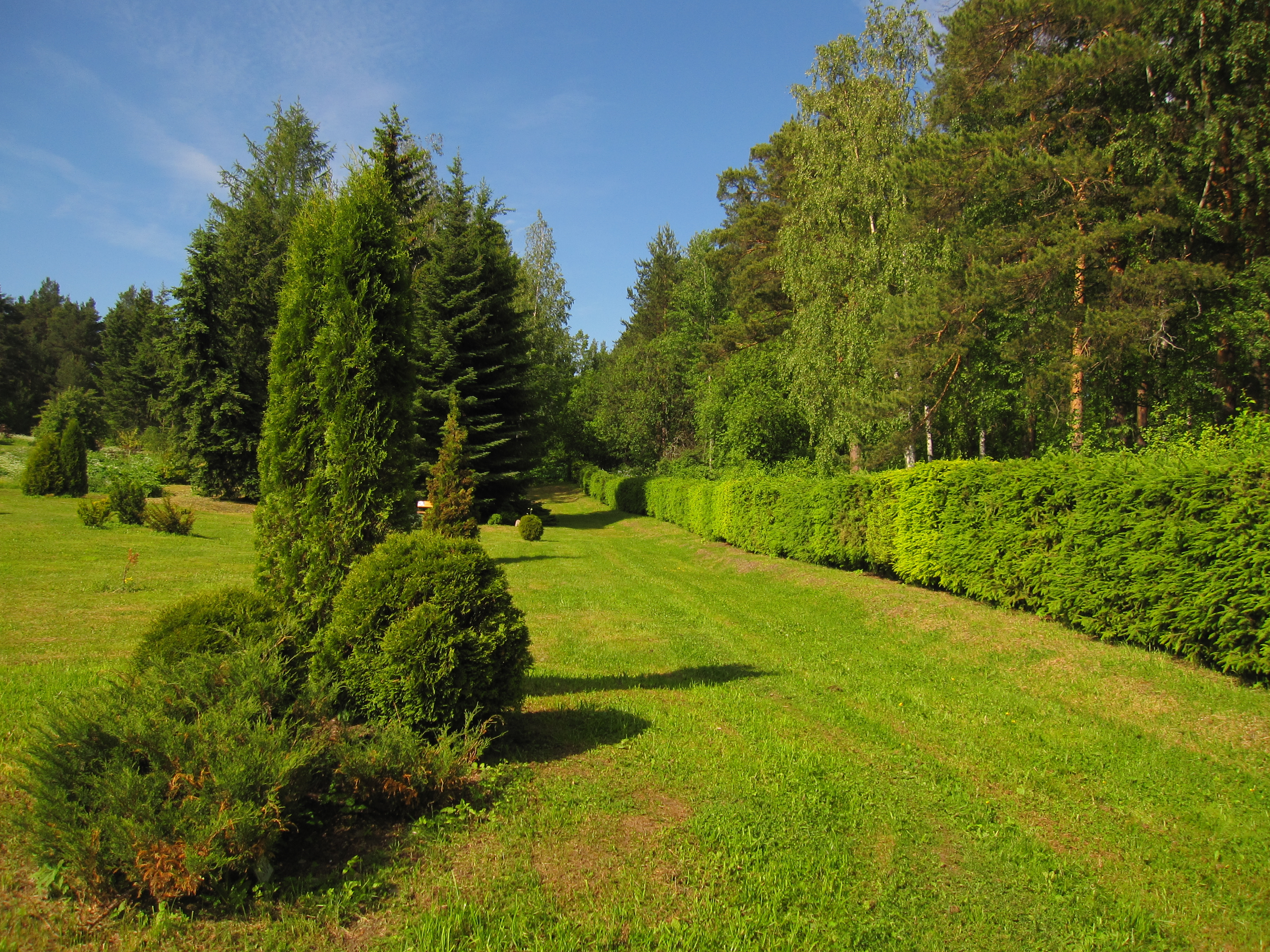
Botanical garden of Petrozavodsk State University

On April 24, 1940 the congress of the Communist Party KFSSR was held, where the leader of Karelo-Finnish SSR G.N. Kupriyanov showed his report. It claimed that it's needed to pay special attention to the development of higher education in the region in order to improve the economic and cultural life and science of the country. On June 2, 1940 a decree of the Central Committee of the Communist Party and the Council of People's Commissars of the Karelo-Finnish SSR "About opening of the Karelian-Finnish State University" was published. The leadership of the USSR supported this decision, and the Council of People's Commissars of the USSR adopted a resolution No. 1209 about the opening of the Karelian-Finnish State University (based on the Karelian State Pedagogical Institute) on June 10, 1940. The university was called KFGU in abbreviated form, consisted of 4 faculties: historical and philological, physical and mathematical, biological, geographical and hydrogeological. The goal of university was preparing a large number of specialists for the national economy and the development of scientific research.

Formation of the University turned out to very tricky process. A lot of difficult problems had to be solved connected with the simultaneous building of classrooms, accommodation for teachers and students, purchase of the necessary equipment and appliances, integration of scientific university libraries, the development of work plans and teaching aids. However, all these problems have been solved, and in autumn 1940 17 departments, which counted 62 teachers, including 5 PHD (professors) and 32 associate professors began work in the university. On September 2, 1940, more than 700 students of all courses began their studying at a young university, 417 people of them were freshmen. On September 7, 1940 a grand opening of the university took place.

Tuuri Ivanovich Lehen was appointed as the first head of the university. Konstantin Dmitrievich Mitropolsky was appointed as the vice-president on Academic Affairs and Research. Faculty deans were appointed:

- M.G. Nikulin – History and Philology Department,
- A.A. Raykerus – Physics and Mathematics Department,
- E.D. Manevitch – Department of Biology,
- M.A. Toikka – geological and hydrological Department.

On May 21, 1941 the Scientific Council was approved, that consisted of 25 members. The Council solved the various issues associated with university life, and could award academic degrees and titles in the following specialties: theoretical physics, human and animal physiology, plant physiology, genetics, history of the USSR, folklore.

=== University in the Great Patriotic War ===
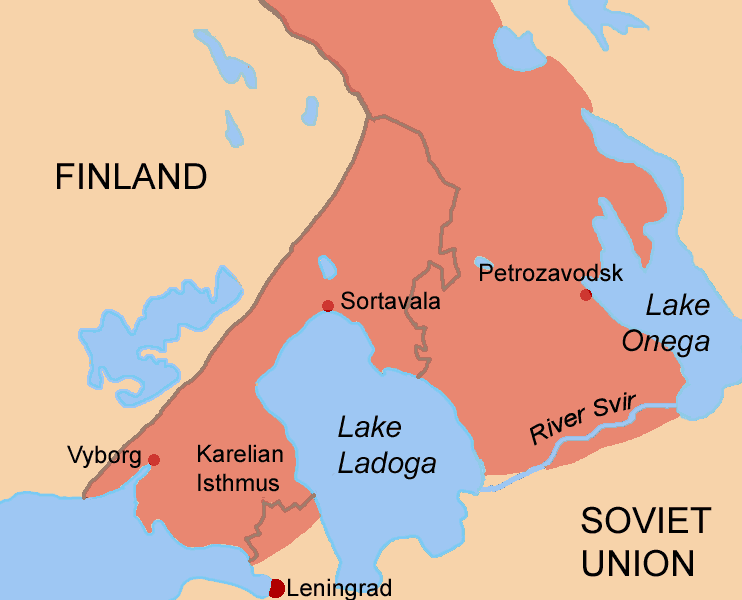
Finnish advance in Karelia during the Continuation War. Old border marked in grey.

The first school year was coming to an end, students were passing the session making plans for the summer. But these plans were not realized. On June 22, 1941 at 4.00 am the Great Patriotic War began. In connection with this event on June 28 the general university meeting was held in Petrozavodsk at which the participants expressed their desire to fight against the enemy and to give their strength for the victory over him. During the first months of the war the students, the members of staff, teachers went to the front, also the rector of the university T. I. Lekhen was among them. In total 328 man left to the war. The students and teachers made contribution to the struggle against the enemy not only at the battlefield but also in the rear they worked at the factories, built fortifications.

At the end of the summer 1941 the front was approaching the city of Petrozavodsk (on October 1, 1941 Petrozavodsk was completely occupied by the Finnish army). The government decided to evacuate the university. They were able to take a significant part of the university property to the town of Syktyvkar Komi Republic. The university continued its work there cooperating closely with the Komi pedagogical institute. In this difficult period the leadership of the PetrSU was carried by K. D. Mirtopolsky. Vice-rector of two universities was the rector of the pedagogical institute G. P. Balin.

In spite of the hardships of the war the research activities did not cease, although some research topics have changed: now they were focusing on the needs of defense industry, the tasks of the national economic development of the Northern region and an identifying the reserves for military needs. For example, scientists-geologists carried out the exploration of mineral resources in the Republic of Komi and the Urals, and the Department of Plant Physiology studied the frost-resisting ability of potato, the acclimatization of tobacco and sugar beets in the North.

In June 1944 during the Svir-Petrozavodsk military operation there was the defeat of the invaders in the south of Karelia. On June 28 of that year soviet troops entered Petrozavodsk. In autumn the whole territory of Karelia was liberated. In June 1944 the government of the Karelo-Finnish SSR decided to return the university to Petrozavodsk. On July 30, 1944 the teachers with their families and students returned to Petrozavodsk from Syktyvkar. During the war the university building was destroyed, all remaining equipment and the library were destroyed. The students and the staff of the university had to make exert every effort on its reconstruction. In the reconstruction the leaders of the Karelian republic took an active part too. The number of teaching staff of the university increased thanks to the teachers who were returning from the front. The new school year 1944 started on October 2, and 242 students began to learn. In summer 1945 the university celebrated its fifth anniversary. In August 1945 in Petrozavodsk State University the new rector V. S. Chepurnov began his activity.

Hard time of the Great Patriotic War the university survived with dignity, it didn't stop its activity and on the contrary – it directed all the energies for the victory. Its students, teachers and collaborators were working hard and were fighting on the front and in the rear. Unfortunately, not all of them were able to live up to a happy Victory Day. During the Great Patriotic War 90 students, teachers and collaborators were killed and were missing. The fate of 42 people is unknown. But in spite of everything in the period from 1942 to 1945 years 65 students graduated from the university, among them there were one geographer, three geologists, six mathematicians, 21 biologists, 34 historians and philologists.

=== Founding and development of PetrSU during 1950s–1960s ===
During the post-war restoration of the Karelian Republic there was a significant shortage of qualified personnel. To address that problem, the local government in cooperation with USSR Ministry of Higher Education decreed to expand the university's program in various fields, such as heavy industry, civil construction and agriculture.

In 1951, the technical engineering faculty was created, with V. S. Artamonov as dean. That faculty was training forest engineers, agriculturists and zootechnicians. In May 1954 that faculty was divided into two separate ones: the forest engineering faculty with the dean A. L. Lukashin and the geological prospecting faculty with the dean V. S. Artamonov. In 1956, the forest engineering faculty opened a night school branch for the workers and employees of the Onega Tractor Plant. The same year, the USSR Ministry of Geology saw inexpedient to continue training of geological prospecting specialists within the Karelo-Finnish University, so the last group of geologists graduated from there in 1960.

In 1951, the physics and mathematics faculty and the biological faculty were suspended, and in their place the natural mathematics faculty was created, on which students learned math, biology and agriculture. In February 1954 that faculty was divided into two: the physics and mathematics faculty with the dean A. A. Raikerus and the natural faculty (renamed to agricultural in 1958) with the dean M. P. Mironova.

On October 8, 1956, the first issue of the large circulation newspaper "Petrozavodsk University" was published. The content for the newspaper was being proposed by lecturers and students. The newspaper has a page on the university's website since 1996.

In 1957 the new rules for enrollment were issued, according to these rules the enrollees with at least two years work experience and ex-servicemen of the Soviet Army had an advantage. Shortly before that, the tuition fees were cancelled.

In 1958, the university's faculties were assigned internship bases, according to the new law of linking the school to daily life.

From 1957 to 1963, the enrollment to the Finnish language and literature majors of the History and Philology faculty was temporarily suspended, as the faculty underwent reformations.

In 1960, the medical faculty was created. Initial yearly enrollment was up to 150 students for the day courses and 50 for the night courses (since 1961). N. B. Likhacheva, the representative of Leningrad medical school, became the dean.

In 1962, the general technology faculty was created (abbr. GTF, Russian: ОТФ). It consisted of four subjects: mechanics, construction, energetics and technical. The faculty also conducted night courses and correspondence courses in more than 50 disciplines in three years, after which the students were transferred into other engineering subjects within the university, or to other technical universities of the country.

On June 16, 1964 by a decree of Central Committee of the USSR Communist Party and the USSR Council of Ministries the university was named after O. V. Kuusinen.

In 1968, from the construction discipline a new faculty of industrial and civil construction was created (abbr. ICC, Russian: ПГС) with professor V. V. Kazin as dean.

Because of all these reformations, the university managed to become a source of wide-purpose qualified workforce, the income of new students increased considerably as well as the numbers of professors and lecturers. For example, in 1970 the university had 483 lecturers working in 47 departments, 30 of them being Ph.D. or professors, and 190 assistant professors. The final number of employees came to 529.

In the 1950s and 1960s, extensive scientific research was being conducted within the university, for example, the students and professors of the History and Philology faculty actively participated in archeological, folklorist and linguistic expeditions, gathering valuable information on the history and culture of the native peoples of the republic. Thanks to the works of some historians, a large number of new documentary sources were unveiled to a wide range of readers. The university's linguists took part in assembling Russian-Finnish and Finnish-Russian dictionaries (published in 1947, 1955, 1963). The STEM field scientists of the university also conducted valuable research and acquired particular results, such as developing methods of separation and analysis of optically active isomers of important biological compounds – amino acids, phosphatides; or studies into the process of destruction of metals and alloys due to material fatigue.

Within the same time period, the non-curricular student life was developing swiftly. In 1952, the university's theatrical studio was created by an Honored Artist of Karelia, Y. A. Sungurov. It staged various plays based on the works of A. Ostrovsky, L. Oshanin, A. Arbuzov, B. Brecht, that were warmly welcomed by the viewers. At the same time, a Finnish dramatical club was created under the supervision of an Honored Artist of USSR and Karelia T. I. Lankinen. 1962 is the birth year of the university's academic choir, led by G. E. Terazuyanets. In 1964, the tourist club "Sampo" was founded under the supervision of Y. S. Lanev, to guide hundreds of students into the wild unknown during the years. In 1966, the International Friendship club "The Globe" was created, which conducted numerous events for establishing international academic connections. Special attention was also paid to the physical education, various sports sections were created, of which the skiing section was prevalent.

During the period of 1951–1970, about 7000 specialists graduated from the university and were highly praised not only in Karelia, but overall.

=== PetrSU in 1970–1985 ===
Thanks to the coordinated efforts of university employees, the Karelian-Finnish State University's influence grew rapidly in Karelia and the European North.

In 1973, Mikhail Shumilov became the new rector of the university. He had a PhD in History and was well known for his monographs about the history of Karelia and Northern Europe.

In 1975, the Department of Accounting was opened in the university as a part of the School of Mathematics and Physics. The main impetus behind the opening of this department was the lack of qualified accountants and economists in Karelia. The first class of accounting students graduated in 1979 and consisted of 52 young specialists. In 1980, the School of Economics was opened. It consisted of three departments: political economy, accounting and economic activity, and sectorial economy. The first dean of the school was S. N. Polyakov. In 1982, he was replaced by A. G. Rusakov.

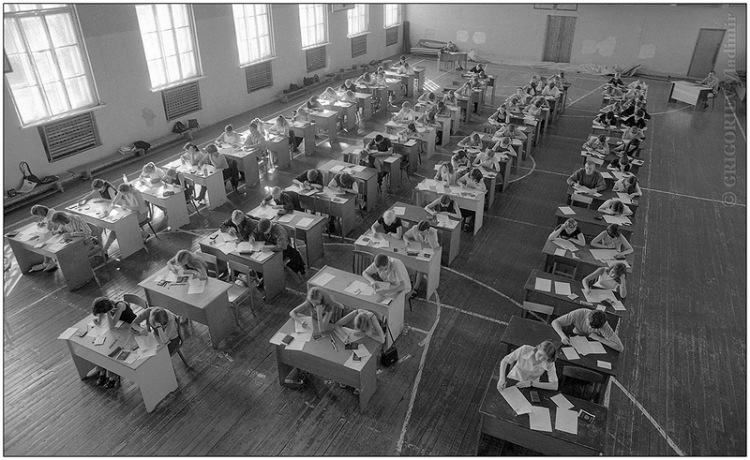
Entrants in the entrance exams (in gym).

To increase the popularity of the University among prospective students, departments and schools of the University put a lot of effort in distributing information about the university in Karelia and neighboring areas. Additionally, a number of special training courses (recruiting about 1,800 people) were organized. University teachers organized meetings with high school students where they talked about opportunities the students would get at the university. The so-called "Open Door Days" were organized regularly. As a result, competition for admission grew to about 2.3 students per available slot.

Special attention was paid to improvement of the level of teacher qualification. Teachers now could take additional vacation to earn master and doctoral (PhD) degrees. The university had 40–50 graduate students each year.

In 1970s special attention was also paid to the technical equipment of the university. Eight classrooms were equipped to display movies and two classrooms became language laboratories. Computer classrooms were also upgraded and the third generation computers ES-1022 and ES-1035 were installed.

PetrSU was one of the first universities that implemented an integrated program of the USSR Ministry of Higher Education called "ICS-university". To improve the work of the university, the university researchers developed a number of software systems including "Entrant", "Number of students", "Session", "Current control", "Social and political practice," "Graduate student," "Control of decision implementation", and "Human Resources Staff".

From the early 1970s to 1985, approximately 14,300 students graduated from the university.

=== PetrSU in 1985–1990 ===
In the second half of the 1980s, system of higher education of Soviet Union was reorganized. In 1987, the Central Committee of the CPSU and the Council of Ministers of the USSR published decrees, which said that university education was the most perfect form for organization and education of youth.

In 1986, technical faculty was abolished within the framework of general changes in the university. Faculty of history and philology was divided into two independent faculties – philological and historical. The faculty of physics and mathematics was divided into the faculty of physics and the faculty of mathematics also.

University management has always held the view that the education system had to be constantly improved, so in the second half of 1980 educational and work plans were revised, modified or supplemented in all faculties. In the training sessions the priority was given to active and creative mastery of the material. From this moment students have more time for independent work.

In 1987, in the framework of the program aimed at continuous development of education, courses for improve of professional skills were created for leading workers of the national economy.

In the second half of the 1980s, cooperation with foreign universities was expanded. Relations were established with the universities of the cities of Oulu and Kupio (Finland), Umeå (Sweden), Duluth (United States). There was an exchange of teachers and students between universities and PetrSU and also joint scientifics researches were conducted.

In 1988, the construction of a new university building was started, called Drevlyanka, district of Petrozavodsk.

During this period, public student deaneries, which dealt with issues related to the scholarship and extracurricular pastime of students, were created at the mathematical, physical, medical and biological faculties.

== International collaboration ==
The university is a member of the University of the Arctic. UArctic is an international cooperative network based in the Circumpolar Arctic region, consisting of more than 200 universities, colleges, and other organizations with an interest in promoting education and research in the Arctic region. The collaboration has been paused after the beginning of the Russo-Ukrainian War in 2022.

== PetrSU activities ==
Students of PetrSU fully participate in different activities which include more than 30 creative teams.

== Sports ==
20 sports sections are supported by PetrSU.

== Social support ==
- 500 students spend their holidays on the Black Sea coast annually
