= Karl Rautio =

Soviet composer (1889–1963)

Karl "Kalle" Rautio (Russian: Карл Эрикович Раутио; 20 November 1889 – 15 December 1963) was the composer of the Anthem of the Karelo-Finnish Soviet Socialist Republic and one of the founders of professional musical art in Karelia.

== Biography ==
An ethnic Karelian, Karl Rautio was born into a peasant family in the Vaasa region of the Grand Duchy of Finland in 1889. The Rautios immigrated to the United States in 1903, where he made out a living as a miner, along with studying music. Rautio enrolled as a music student at the University of California, Berkeley in 1916, graduating in 1920. In 1922, he immigrated to the Soviet Union, settling in Karelia.

From 1931 to 1935, he organized and conducted the Radio Symphony Orchestra of the Karelian Autonomous Soviet Socialist Republic, whose first performance over the Soviet airwaves took place under his direction in 1931. Together with the Finnish poet Armas Äikiä, who wrote the lyrics, Rautio submitted the winning entry for music and lyrics for the Anthem of the Karelo-Finnish Soviet Socialist Republic in 1945. He died in Petrozavodsk.

Petrozavodsk's K. E. Rautio Musical College, formerly known as the Petrozavodsk School of Music, bears Karl Rautio's name since December 29, 1971. A sign marking the location of his house in Petrozavodsk was installed in 1987.
