= Anthem of the Karelo-Finnish Soviet Socialist Republic =

Historical national anthem of Karelia

Karjalais-suomalainen SNT hymni
English: Anthem of the Karelo-Finnish SSR
- Musical sheet of the anthem
- Former regional anthem of the Karelo-Finnish SSR
- Lyrics: Armas Äikiä
- Music: Karl Rautio
- Adopted: 1945
- Relinquished: 16 July 1956 (demoted to ASSR)
- Succeeded by: State Anthem of the Soviet Union

Audio sample
- Anthem of the Karelo-Finnish SSR – Karjalais-suomalainen SNT hymni (instrumental): file; help

The State Anthem of the Karelo-Finnish SSR (Finnish: Karjalais-suomalaisen SNT hymni) was the national anthem of Karelia (now a federal subject of Russia) when it was a republic of the Soviet Union and known as the Karelo-Finnish SSR.

== Background ==
In 1945, the Karelo-Finnish SSR's government held a competition to create a state anthem. The winning entry (written by Armas Äikiä and composed by Karl Rautio) was adopted as the SSR's official anthem in the early 1950s until 1956 when it was re-absorbed into the Russian SFSR. Along with the Georgian and Estonian SSR anthems, it was one of the only three Soviet republic anthems that did not mention the Russian people.

== Lyrics ==
Finnish original

I
Oma Karjalais-suomalaiskansamme maa,
Vapaa Pohjolan Neuvostojen tasavalta.
Kotimetsäimme kauneus öin kajastaa
Revontultemme taivaalta leimuavalta.

Kerto:
Neuvostoliitto on voittamaton,
Se kansamme suur-isänmaa ijät on.
Sen Tienä on Kansojen Kunniantie,
Se Karjalan Kansankin voittoihin vie.

II
Isänmaa Kalevan, kotimaa runojen,
Jota Leninin Stalinin lippu johtaa.
Yli kansamme uutteran onnellisen
Valo kansojen veljeystähdestä hohtaa.

Kerto

III
Kotimaamme loi uudeksi kansamme työ,
Tätä maata me puollamme kuin isät ammoin.
Sotasuksemme suihkavat kalpamme lyö.
Asemahdilla suojaamme Neuvosto-Sammon.

Kerto

Karelian version

I
Oma karjalas-suomelasrahvahan mua,
Välly Pohjolan Nevvostoloin tazavaldu.
Kodimeččien čomevus (Note: or čomus) yöl kajostuakseh
selgielöin rebointuliloin taivahalpäi

Kertou:
Nevvostoliitto on voittamatoi
Se rahvahien suur-ižänmua ijät on.
Sen tienny on rahvahien kunnivotie
Se Karjalan rahvahangi voittoloih vie.

II
Ižänmua Kalevalan, kodimua runoloin,
Midä Leninin Stalinin flagu johtau.
Piäliči rahvahan ruadain ozakkahan
Valgo rahvahien vellestiähtespäi čilkettäy

Kertou

III
Kodimuan luaji uvvekse rahvahan ruado,
Tädä muadu myö puolistammo gu tuatat ammui.
Sodasukset sukatah miekat iškietäh.
Azeväel suojuammo Nevvosto-Sammon.

Kertou

English translation

I
Native land of the Karelo-Finnish folks,
The free Northern Republic of the Soviets.
At night the beauty of our forests shines,
And the auroras illuminate our skies.

Chorus:
Invincible is the Soviet Union,
Karelia's forever a part of it.
Our glee's to follow the great fatherland
To glorious victories.

II
Kaleva's fatherland, the runes' native land,
Now led by the banner of Lenin and Stalin.
The light of the fraternal folks' star shines
Over our industrious and merry people.

Chorus

III
The labour of our folks revived our homeland,
We'll defend this land just like our fathers did.
Our skies rustle, and our swords attack.
With our arms' strength, we’ll save the Soviet Sampo.

Chorus

== See also ==
- Anthem of the Republic of Karelia
