= Anthem of the Estonian Soviet Socialist Republic =

Eesti Nõukogude Sotsialistliku Vabariigi hümn
English: Anthem of the Estonian SSR
- Former regional anthem of the Estonian SSR
- Lyrics: Johannes Semper
- Music: Gustav Ernesaks
- Adopted: 20 July 1945; 21 July 1956 (modified version)
- Relinquished: 8 May 1990

Audio sample
- State Anthem of the Estonian SSR (1945 version): file; help

Vocal
Vocal recording from 1978

Orchestral instrumental recording

The Anthem of the Estonian Soviet Socialist Republic was the official anthem of the Estonian Soviet Socialist Republic, established during the Soviet occupation. It was used from 20 July 1945 until 8 May 1990, when the use of Soviet symbols was officially discontinued in Estonia, a year before the full restoration of Estonian independence.

== Background ==
In 1944, the republican communist parties were instructed to create official state anthems for their respective republics. The Bureau of the Central Committee of the Communist Party of Estonia established a commission to oversee the creation of the anthem. The commission organized a competition and tasked selected poets in Russia, as Estonian territory was still under German control, with writing the lyrics. The invited poets included Johannes Vares, Chairman of the Presidium of the Supreme Soviet of the Estonian SSR.

Poet Debora Vaarandi later recalled that participation in the competition was unenthusiastic and that many poets "did little more than fulfil an obligation." Dissatisfied with the quality of the submissions, Deputy Chairman of the Council of Ministers of the Estonian SSR Nigol Andresen personally tried to compile a new version of the lyrics by combining elements from several of the entries.

The anthem was presented to the central government of the USSR in May 1944, three months after the Presidium of the Supreme Soviet of the USSR had issued the decree "On the Anthems of the Soviet Republics" on 3 February 1944.

The melody was composed by Gustav Ernesaks, and the lyrics were written by Johannes Semper. The anthems of the Estonian SSR, the Karelo-Finnish SSR, and the Georgian SSR were the only Soviet regional anthems that did not mention either Russia or the Russians (people) in their lyrics.

The anthem's lyricist, Johannes Semper, an ardent communist, became one of many so-called June Communists (communists who had lived in Estonia before the war) who fell victim to the political purges, when a fight between June Communists and communists from Russia who had moved to Estonia after the war broke out, the intraparty fight ended with the win of the Russian born communists, led by Johannes "Ivan" Käbin.

In 1950, Semper lost his position as the chairman of the Estonian Writers' Union, got expelled from the Communist Party, and was stripped of his title of Merited Writer of the Estonian SSR. During the meeting the newly appointed First Secretary of the Communist Party of Estonia, Käbin, also raised questions about the anthem. He asked Semper whether the original 3rd stanza (Whatever storms may rage above you, they cannot bring you down. You shall remain dear to our hearts until death, our distant northern homeland. And if you must walk the path of struggle, courage shall never fade from our hearts) were an expression of bourgeois nationalism. Semper answered short "Yes". When he asked to be allowed to continue working as a writer, Käbin replied: "No one will take that right away from you. Out of the Party!" In practice, however, Semper was placed on the list of prohibited authors, and publication of his works was banned. Reduced to poverty, he appealed to Alexander Fadeyev, chairman of the Union of Soviet Writers, who secured him permission to work as a translator.

Following Joseph Stalin's death in 1953 and the subsequent political thaw, earlier decisions began to be reviewed. Semper was reinstated as a member of the Estonian Writers' Union in 1955. Käbin, however, refused to acknowledge that the decisions of the Stalin-era Party plenum had been mistaken: "The decisions were 100% correct. As for Semper, he simply corrected himself and wrote "Red Carnations" ("Punased nelgid", 1955), which is a good work."

The revision of the anthem's lyrics after Stalin's death was also entrusted to Semper. He began working on a new de-stalinized version in 1954, but its approval was repeatedly delayed. According to Party records, Käbin informed colleagues in 1954 that the Secretary of Ideology of the Communist Party Mikhail Suslov had reviewed the draft in Moscow and instructed that the word socialism be added while references to Stalin had to be put back in. This version was rejected in Moscow. The issue returned to the agenda of the Estonian Communist Party in 1955. Among the points discussed was a reference to Vladimir Lenin's visit to Tallinn in the new version, which was ultimately omitted. Semper's revised text still failed to receive approval in Moscow, where the instruction now was to remove all references to Stalin after all. The now again Stalin free lyrics were approved by Moscow and officially adopted in 1956.

During the Soviet occupation of Estonia, performing or reciting the melody or lyrics of "Mu isamaa, mu õnn ja rõõm", the national anthem of the independent Republic of Estonia, was prohibited by law and could result in criminal punishment by the Soviet authorities. Another song composed by Ernesaks, "Mu isamaa on minu arm", became a means of expressing national sentiment and was widely regarded by Estonians as their unofficial national anthem.

On 8 May 1990, "Mu isamaa, mu õnn ja rõõm" was restored as the national anthem of Estonia, alongside the restoration of the blue-black-white national flag and the official state name, the Republic of Estonia.

== Lyrics ==
Estonian original

Jää kestma, Kalevite kange rahvas,
ja seisa kaljuna, me kodumaa!
Ei vaibund kannatustes sinu vahvus,
end läbi sajanditest murdsid sa
1945-1956: ja tõusid töötajate vabaks maaks,
1956-1990: ja tõusid õitsvaks sotsialismimaaks,
et päikene su päevadesse paista saaks.

Nüüd huuga, tehas, vili, nurmel vooga,
sirp, lõika, alasile, haamer, löö!
Nõukogu elu, tuksu võimsa hooga,
too õnne rahvale, me tubli töö!
Me Liidu rahvaste ja riike seas
sa, Eesti, sammu esimeste kindlas reas!

1945-1956:
Kui kants-nii seisavad su kodurannad,
su ees vaid lainetavad laiad veed.
Sa kõrgel Leninlikku lippu kannad
suur Stalin juhtimas su tõusuteed.
Käi kindlalt, saatmas sind su õnneteel
me võitlusvaim ja kohkumatu mehemeel!

1956-1990:
Sa kõrgel leninlikku lippu kannad
ja julgelt kommunismi rada käid.
Partei me sammudele suuna annab
ja võidult võitudele viib ta meid.
Ta kindlal juhtimisel kasva sa
ja tugevaks ning kauniks saa, me kodumaa!

English translation

Endure, heroic people of Kalevs
And stand like a boulder, our homeland!
Your courage did not subside in the sufferings,
You broke yourself through the centuries,
1945-1956: and arose a workers country in blossom,
1956-1990: and became a flourishing socialist country,
For the sun could shine in your days.

Now roar! O factory! Flow! O crops on cornfields!
Reap! O sickle! And strike! O hammer!
May the Soviet life throb in mighty swing;
May happiness be brought to the folks through good labor!
Among the peoples and states of our Union,
You, Estonia, march at the firm forefront!

1945-1956:
Your home beaches stand like a castle,
Wide waters only wave before you.
You're bearing Lenin's banner high,
Great Stalin's leading your ascent.
March steadily with our fighting spirit
And bold manly mind guiding you!

1956-1990:
You're bearing Lenin's banner high,
And boldly following the path of Communism.
Our Party will give us direction
And will lead us from victory to victory.
You will grow under its firm leadership
And become strong and beautiful, our Homeland!
