= Tuure Lehén =

Finnish-Soviet politician (1893–1976)

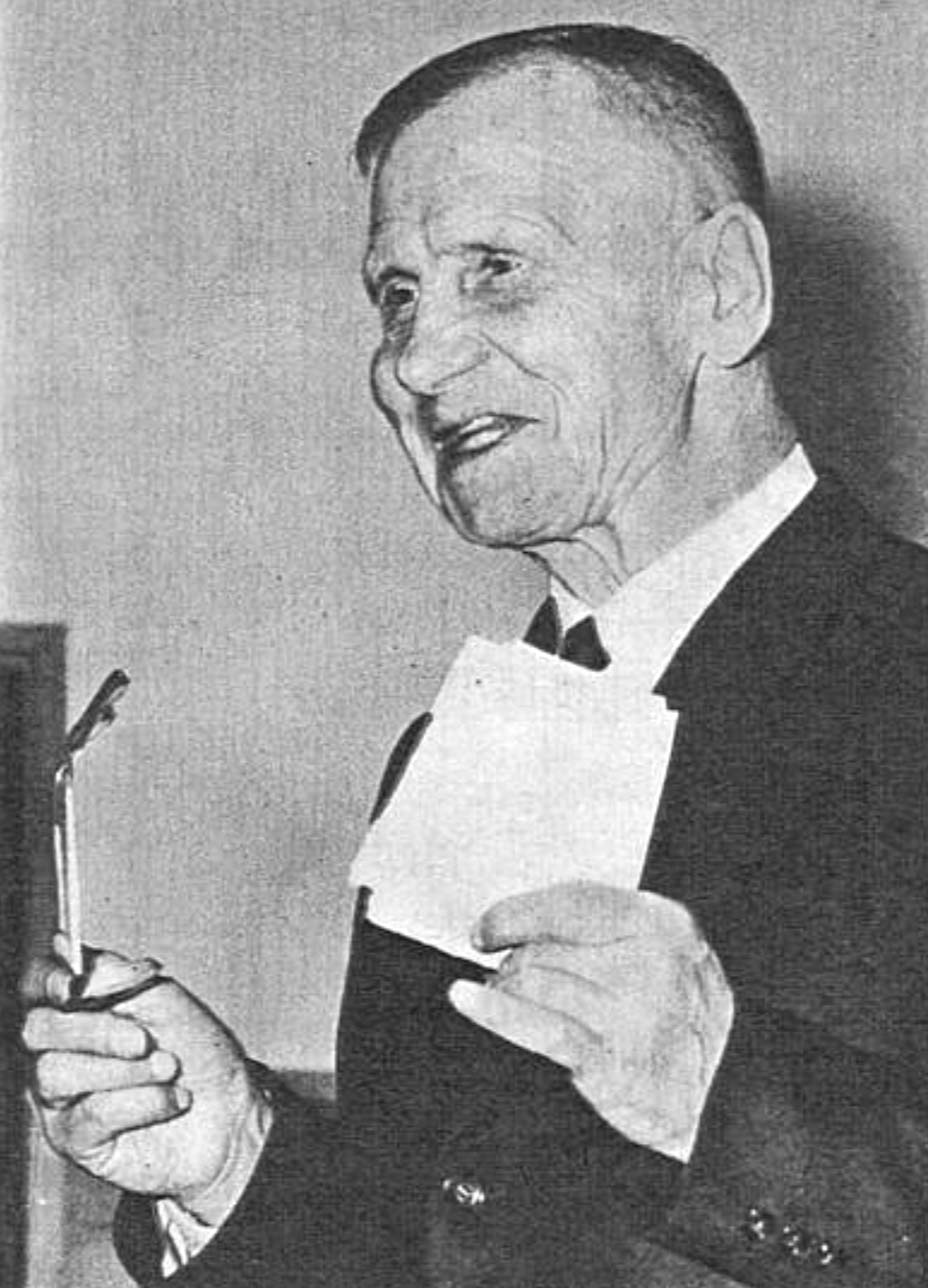
- Lehén in the early 1960s

Minister of Interior of the Finnish Democratic Republic
- In office 2 December 1939 – 12 March 1940
- Preceded by: Position established
- Succeeded by: Position abolished

Personal details
- Born: 28 April 1893 Jämsänkoski, Grand Duchy of Finland, Russian Empire
- Died: 12 October 1976 (aged 83) Helsinki, Finland
- Party: Social Democratic Party of Finland (1912–1918); Communist Party of Finland (1918–1976); Communist Party of the Soviet Union (1918–1976)
- Spouse: Hertta Kuusinen
- Education: University of Helsinki; International Lenin School
- Profession: Philosopher, journalist, translator, historian

Military service
- Allegiance: Finnish Socialist Workers' Republic Spanish Republic Soviet Union
- Unit: Red Guards; International Brigades
- Battles/wars: Finnish Civil War; Spanish Civil War; World War II

Tuure Valdemar Lehén (28 April 1893 – 12 October 1976) was a Finnish and Soviet communist politician as well as a philosopher, journalist and historian.

== Biography ==
Lehén was born in to family of a carpenter. In 1915 he entered the University of Helsinki and studied in its Faculty of Philosophy. Initially, in 1913–18 as a member of the Social Democratic Party of Finland, and since 1918 as a member of the Communist Party of Finland. After the Civil War he underwent training in the Frunze Military Academy. He first came to prominence by writing texts on mob fighting and strike tactics, and in 1926 married Hertta Kuusinen.

From 1925 he was an illegal activist of the Communist Party of Germany for the Communist International. Lehén also fought in the Spanish Civil War and was among the chief of staff of the International Brigades. Returning to Moscow in 1927, he was appointed head of the Central Military-Political School of the Executive Committee of the Communist International and studied in the International Lenin School.

He served as Minister of Internal Affairs in the People's Provisional Government unsuccessfully orchestrated by the Soviet Union for Finland in December 1939. He was also the first rector (1940–41) of Karelo-Finnish, now Petrozavodsk State University. After World War II he became a general in the Red Army.

After the war in 1946, Lehén returned to Finland and continued his research work as the director of the publishing company Kansankulttuuri. Lehén's works interpreting Marx and Engels for Finns were long considered by Finnish Communists to be the most important works in the field used when studying Marxism–Leninism. The most famous of Lehén's philosophical and political works was the Working Class Worldview, written in the late 1940s.

Lehén bore the title of Honorary Doctor of Moscow State University. He died in 1976 in Helsinki and was buried at the Malmi Cemetery.

== Works ==
- The Road to Victory (originally Der Weg zum Sieg; pseudonym Alfred Langer). Published in German in 1926, in Finnish in 1928 and 1932.
- Työväenluokan maailmankatsomus: Luentoja dialektisesta materialismista. 2. painos 1950. Helsinki: Kansankulttuuri, 1950.
- Kommunismi ja kristinusko. 2. painos 1953. Helsinki: Kansankulttuuri, 1951.
- Kansa ja valtio: Luentoja marxilaisen valtio-opin alkeista. Helsinki: Kansankulttuuri, 1952.
- Työväenluokan maailmankatsomus: Luentoja dialektisesta materialismista. 3. uusittu ja täydennetty painos. Kotka: [s.n.], 1959. Teoksen verkkoversio.
- Työväenluokan maailmankatsomus: Luentoja dialektisesta materialismista. 4. painos. Helsinki: Kansankulttuuri, 1962.
- Materialisteja ja idealisteja: Tutustumisretki filosofian historiaan. Helsinki: Kansankulttuuri, 1964.
- Työväenluokan maailmankatsomus: Luentoja dialektisesta materialismista. Työväenliikkeen tietokirjoja, Taskusarja. 5. painos. – 6. painos 1972. – 7. painos 1976. Helsinki: Kansankulttuuri, 1971.
- Vallankaappaushölmöily 1948. Kansankulttuuri 1948.
- Kansa ja valtio (neuvostomarxismin mukaista valtio-oppia)
- Punaisten ja valkoisten sota. Kansankulttuuri 1967.
