= Finland–Soviet Union Peace and Friendship Society =

Finnish organization

The Finland–Soviet Union Peace and Friendship Society (Finnish: Suomen–Neuvostoliiton rauhan ja ystävyyden seura, SNS) was a Finnish anti-war propaganda organization founded on 22 May 1940 by Communist politician Mauri Ryömä in the aftermath of the Winter War between the Soviet Union and Finland. It called for an avoidance of future wars and maintained a firmly pro-Soviet stand, distributing propaganda leaflets and participating in riots. It had 35,000 paying members in 115 local branches within five months after its founding.

On 24 July the Soviet foreign minister Vyacheslav Molotov accused the Finnish government of persecuting the society and later he publicly supported it. The society organized demonstrations, some of which turned into riots. On 23 December however it was banned, having been widely seen as a front organization of the illegal Communist Party of Finland and as detrimental to the national interests of Finland.

== See also ==
- Winter War
- Finnish Democratic Republic
