= Karjalan kunnailla =

Karjalan kunnailla (Karelian: Karjalan kumbuzil), lit. 'On the Hills of Karelia', is a Finnish folk song. Lyrics were created by Valter Juva in 1902. Karelian Iivo Härkönen also published an early Karelianist adaptation of Juva's original Finnish lyrics in the Livvi-Karelian language of East Karelia. The music of the Anthem of the Republic of Karelia was derived from this song.

== Lyrics ==
Finnish lyrics

Jo Karjalan kunnailla lehtii puu,
jo Karjalan koivikko tuuhettuu.
Käki kukkuu siellä ja kevät on,
vie sinne mun kaiho pohjaton.

Mä tunnen vaaras ja vuoristovyös
ja kaskien sauhut ja uinuvat yös
ja synkkäin metsies aarniopuut
ja siintävät salmes ja vuonojes suut.

Siell’ usein matkani määrätöin
läpi metsien kulki ja näreikköin.
Minä seisoin vaaroilla paljain päin,
missä Karjalan kauniin eessäin näin.

Tai läksin kyliin urhojen luo,
Miss’ ylhillä vaaroilla asui nuo;
Näin miehet kunnon ja hilpeän työn
Ja näin, miss’ sykkii Karjalan syän.

English version

O hills of Karelia, the hills of home,
where birch leaves are budding now spring has come,
and the cuckoo calling both high and low ---
O hills of my homeland, I love you so!

I know every mountain and tree-capped hill,
your smouldering clearings, nights calm and still;
your looming forests and ancient trees,
and glimmering inlets and lakeland seas.

And oft as I roam in your woodlands fair
through groves of green spruce with nary a care,
I climb to a hilltop, rejoicing to see
all my Karjalan heartland spread before me.

Went I to behold your village heroes,
on your verdant hillocks where do dwell those.
Gaze I at men working true merry feats,
lo see where the heart of Karelia beats.

Karelian version

Jo Karjalan kumbuzil puut kukitah,
jo Karjalan koivikot tuuhevutah.
Kägöi kuldane kukkuu, on mua lumetoin,
viey sinne miun kaibavo pohjatoin.

Mie tunnen siun vuares ja kai mäjet nua,
dai kaskinna kai on jo Karjalan mua.
Ja synkis da sankois nois salomais,
ken salmiloin suis nyt souvella sais.

Jo moneh kerdapha kierringi nois,
mie Karjalan huogujahongikkolois
ja vuaroil sen seizoin palahin päin,
dai Karjalan kaiken eis silmäni näin.

Da vuaroin harjoil noil ukkoloin luo
miun nosti jo Karjalan korbi da suo.
Ja siel midä tunzin da kuulin da näin,
dai siit igipäiväzeh kaibavoih jäin.
