= Anthem of the Republic of Karelia =

Государственный гимн Республики Карелия Karjalan Tasavallan valtiohymni
English: State Anthem of the Republic of Karelia
- Coat of arms of the Republic of Karelia
- Regional anthem of Republic of Karelia
- Lyrics: Armas Mishin and Ivan Kostin (Russian); Armas Mishin (Finnish); Alexander Volkov (Karelian)
- Music: Alexander Beloborodov (composer)
- Adopted: 6 April 1993

Audio sample
- Official orchestral and choral vocal recording: file; help

Official orchestral instrumental recording

The State Anthem of the Republic of Karelia was approved by law on 6 April 1993. The music of the anthem was composed by Alexander Beloborodov (composer) and in most parts follows the melody of the Finnish traditional song "Karjalan kunnailla". The Russian lyrics were written by Armas Mishin and Ivan Kostin, whilst the Finnish lyrics were written by Mishin alone, and the Karelian lyrics by Alexander Volkov. Since December 2001, the Russian lyrics are the official ones.

== Authors ==
The translation of the anthem into Finnish was done by poet Armas Mishin.

The anthem was officially performed in Finnish once in 1993, at the Musical Theatre of the Republic of Karelia, immediately after the approval of the first edition of the law "On the text of the national anthem" by the Supreme Council of the Republic of Karelia.

The text of the anthem of the Republic of Karelia was translated into the Livvi dialect of the Karelian language by Karelian poet Alexander Volkov.

== Lyrics ==
Russian lyrics (official)

I
Край родной – Карелия!
Древняя мудрая земля.
Братских племён одна семья,
Карелия!

Звените, озёра, и пой, тайга!
Родная земля, ты мне дорога.
Высоко на сопках твоих стою
И песню во славу тебе пою.

II
Край родной – Карелия!
Ты мне навек судьбой дана.
Здравствуй в веках, моя страна,
Карелия!

Герои былин средь лесов и гор
Живут на земле нашей до сих пор.
Лейся, песня! Кантеле, звонче пой
Во имя карельской земли святой!

III
Край родной – Карелия!
Рун и былин напев живой.
Вижу рассвет лучистый твой,
Карелия!

Вижу рассвет лучезарный твой,
Карелия!

Finnish version

I
Kotimaamme Karjala!
Ikivanha kaunis maa.
Veljeskansat yhteen saa
Karjala!

Nuo järvet ja vaarat ja hongikot-
ne huomisen kutsua kuunnelkoot!
Seisoin vaaran harjalla paljain päin
ja suljin syliini mitä näin.

II
Kotimaamme Karjala!
Ikivanha laulumaa.
Työllään etsii kunniaa
Karjala!

Ne urhot ja sankarit laulujen-
ne asuvat täällä entiselleen.
Soita, soma kantele, jatku, työ!
Soi, laulu, sydämen liekki, lyö.

III
Kotimaamme Karjala!
Rahvas rehti, ahkera
töin ja lauluin ikuistaa
Karjalaa!

Töin ja lauluin ylistää
Karjalaa!

Karelian version

I
Kodirandu – Karjalu!
Igäine kaunis meijän mua.
Heimokanzat yhteh suat,
Karjalu!

Tuo kuunnelkua järvet dai mečät, suot
Kui sydämeh oma mua pajuo tuou.
Se mäin piälpäi selvembi nähtä voi –
Vie parembi kaikkii mua meijän roih.

II
Kodirandu – Karjalu!
Ozan kel elä igä kai.
Ryndähis meijän yksi vai –
Karjalu!

Tiä runoloin rohkiembat poijat vie
Kai eletäh salolois, järvien ies.
Pajo lennä, kandeleh helkieh lyö,
Kiitä Karjalua kaikkie muadu myö.

III
Kodirandu – Karjalu!
Runot dai pajot elos piet.
Nägyy tiä päivännouzu vies,
Karjalu!

Päiväzen nouzu nägyy vies,
Karjalu!

English version

I
O, land of Karelia!
O, country ancient and wise,
One family of brother-nations,
Karelia!

Ring, O lakes! And sing, O taiga!
Thou art to me dear, O native land.
High on thy mountains I stand
And a song to thy glory I chant.

II
O, land of Karelia!
Forever by fate thou art given to me.
Through centuries live long, my country,
Karelia!

Heroes of epics forests and peaks amidst
Still live on our land to this day.
Sing on, O song! Kantele, sing louder yet
In name of Karelian land holy.

III
O, land of Karelia!
Runes and epic fables are alive.
I see thy radiant dawn,
Karelia!

I see thy effulgent dawn,
Karelia!

== See also ==
- Anthem of the Karelo-Finnish Soviet Socialist Republic
