= Fundamentals of Marxism–Leninism =

Soviet book

- Author: Otto Kuusinen
- Original title: Marxismin-Leninismin perusteet
- Translator: Clemens Dutt
- Language: Finnish
- Subject: Political Science
- Publisher: Karjalan ASNT, Lawrence and Wishart
- Publication date: 1960
- Publication place: Finland
- English publication date: 1961
- Pages: 752
- Dewey Decimal: 321

Fundamentals of Marxism–Leninism is a book by a group of Soviet authors headed by Otto Wille Kuusinen. The work is considered one of the fundamental works on dialectical materialism and on Leninist communism. The book remains important in understanding the philosophy and politics of the Soviet Union; it consolidates the work of important contributions to Marxist theory.

== Publication ==
The first edition was published in 1960. A second revised edition was published in 1963. The text draws heavily from the works of Karl Marx and Vladimir Lenin, with additional references to Friedrich Engels and Nikita Khrushchev.

== Synopsis ==
=== Part One: The Philosophical Foundations of The Marxist-Leninist World Outlook ===
Part One of Fundamentals covers materialist and idealist philosophy, the use of dialectics within materialist philosophy and its opposition to metaphysics, and develops a theory of knowledge, truth, necessity, and human freedom.

The text argues that only a consistently materialist approach to philosophy can be truly scientific, since it requires the recognition of the objective existence of matter, as outside and independent of the human mind.

=== Part Two: The Materialist Conception of History ===
Part Two of the work covers Marxist theories of history, or historical materialism, by outlining the role of the mode of production, class, class struggles, the state and the individual in social development.

=== Part Three: Political Economy of Capitalism ===
Part Three summarizes Marx's Das Kapital and Lenin's theory of imperialism.

=== Part Four: Theory and Tactics of the International Communist Movement ===
Part Four covers the Marxist–Leninist strategy of the international communist and working-class movement.

=== Part Five: Socialism and Communism ===
Part Five summarizes the main features of the socialist mode of production.

== See also ==
- Ideology of the Communist Party of the Soviet Union
