= Finnish Democratic Republic =

1939–1940 Soviet puppet state in occupied Karelia

Finnish Democratic Republic Suomen kansanvaltainen tasavalta (Finnish) Demokratiska Republiken Finland (Swedish)
- 1939–1940
- Seal

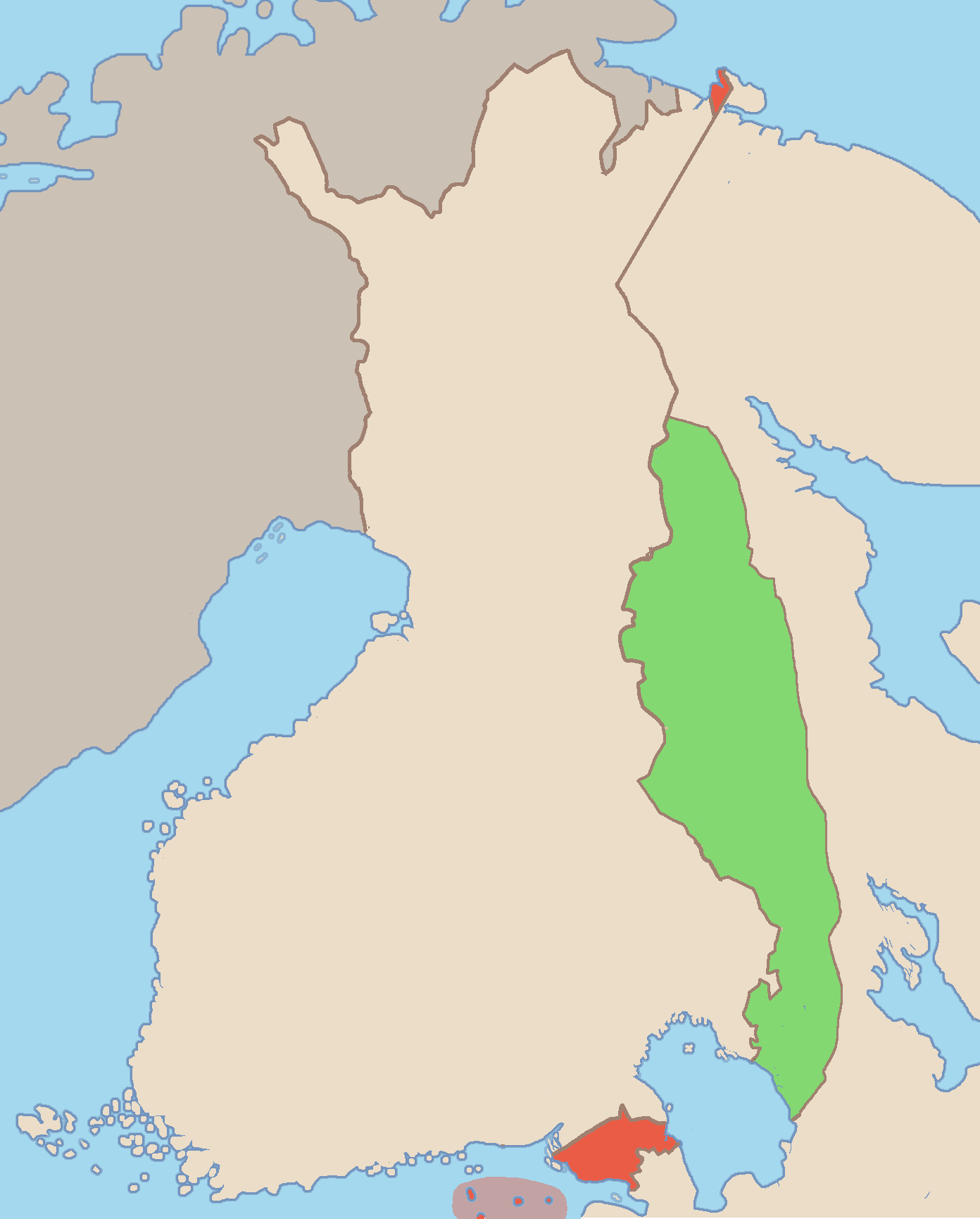
- Anticipated territorial changes of the Finnish Democratic Republic, with areas to be ceded to the Soviet Union (red) and to the Finnish Democratic Republic (green).
- Status: Puppet state of the Soviet Union
- Capital: Helsinki (de jure); Terijoki (de facto)
- Chairman of the People's Government
  - 1939–1940: Otto Wille Kuusinen
- Historical era: World War II
  - Established: 1 December 1939
  - Merged into the Karelo-Finnish Soviet Socialist Republic: 12 March 1940
Preceded by	Succeeded by
Finland	Karelo-Finnish Soviet Socialist Republic
- Today part of: Russia

The Finnish Democratic Republic (Finnish: Suomen kansanvaltainen tasavalta or Suomen kansantasavalta, Swedish: Demokratiska Republiken Finland, Russian: Финляндская Демократическая Республика, romanized: Finlyandskaya Demokraticheskaya Respublika), also known as the Terijoki Government (Finnish: Terijoen hallitus), was a short-lived puppet state of the Soviet Union in occupied Finnish territory from December 1939 to March 1940.

The Finnish Democratic Republic was established by Joseph Stalin upon the outbreak of the Winter War and headed by Otto Wille Kuusinen to govern Finland after Soviet conquest. The Finnish Democratic Republic was only recognised by the Soviet Union and nominally operated in Soviet-occupied areas of Finnish Karelia from the de facto capital of Terijoki. The Finnish Democratic Republic was portrayed by the Soviet Union as the official socialist government of Finland capable of restoring peace, but lost favor as the Soviets sought rapprochement with the Finnish Government. The Finnish Democratic Republic was dissolved and merged into the Karelo-Finnish SSR upon the signing of the Moscow Peace Treaty.

== Creation ==
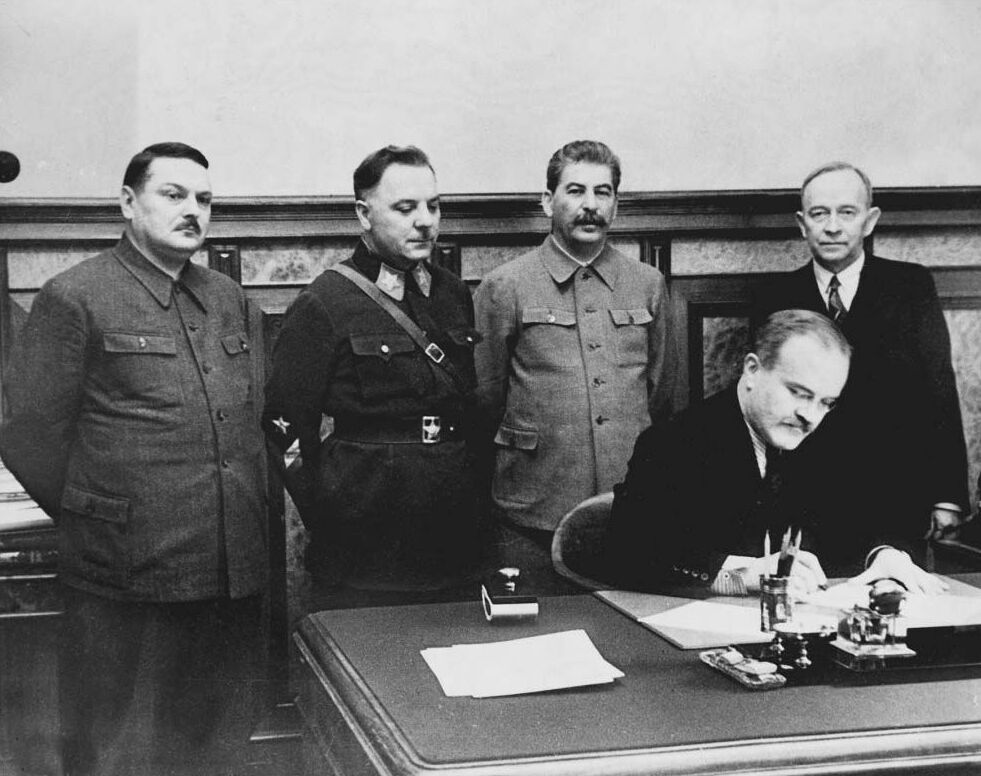
Vyacheslav Molotov signing an agreement between the USSR and the Finnish Democratic Republic in front of Joseph Stalin. Otto Wille Kuusinen, the prime minister and head of government, on the right side of the picture.

The Finnish Democratic Republic was established on 1 December 1939 in the Finnish border town of Terijoki (present-day Zelenogorsk, Saint Petersburg, Russia), a day after the beginning of the Winter War. Terijoki was the first town in Finland captured by the Red Army after the Soviet invasion, and the new government was seated there as its de facto capital. The Finnish Democratic Republic regime was commonly known by the colloquial name the Terijoki Government (Finnish: Terijoen hallitus, Swedish: Terijokiregeringen), but officially the government was called the Finnish People's Government (Finnish: Suomen kansanhallitus Swedish: Finlands folkregering). In Finnish historiography, the government is also occasionally called the Kuusinen Government (Finnish: Kuusisen hallitus Swedish: Kuusinenregeringen).

Otto Wille Kuusinen was chosen as the prime minister and head of government. Kuusinen's cabinet was made up of Soviet citizens and left-wing Finns who had fled to Soviet Russia after the Finnish Civil War. A declaration delivered via TASS on behalf of the Finnish Democratic Republic stated:

The People's Government in its present composition regards itself as a provisional government. Immediately upon arrival in Helsinki, capital of the country, it will be reorganised and its composition enlarged by the inclusion of representatives of the various parties and groups participating in the people's front of toilers. The final composition of the People's Government, its powers and actions, are to be sanctioned by a Diet elected on the basis of universal equal direct suffrage by secret ballot.

Soviet foreign minister Vyacheslav Molotov spoke to the German ambassador to the Soviet Union on 30 November—a day before the proclamation of the Finnish Democratic Republic—saying, "This government will not be Soviet but a democratic republic. Nobody will set up soviets there, but we hope that it will be a government that we can reach agreement with on safeguarding the security of Leningrad." Soviet leaflets dropped over Helsinki on the first day of the Winter War stated: "Finnish Comrades! We come to you not as conquerors, but as liberators of the Finnish people from the oppression of the capitalists and the landlords".

== Relations with the Soviet Union ==
The Soviet government entered into diplomatic relations with the Finnish Democratic Republic's government immediately after its creation. On the first day of its existence, the Kuusinen regime agreed to lease the Hanko Peninsula; to cede a slice of territory on the Karelian Isthmus; and to sell an island in the Gulf of Finland, along with sections of the Kalastajasaarento near the Arctic Ocean to the Soviet Union.

On 2 December 1939, Kuusinen and Molotov signed a mutual assistance agreement and a secret protocol in Moscow. The content of the agreement was very similar to what the Soviet foreign ministry had planned earlier in October 1939, though it never was presented to the Finnish government. According to the new agreement, the Soviet Union would cede a much larger area, Eastern Karelia, except for the Murmansk railroad, in exchange for the same territories that the Soviets had demanded in earlier negotiations from the Republic of Finland.

An earlier draft of the Moscow agreement was signed ten days earlier at Petrozavodsk by Andrei Zhdanov for the USSR and Kuusinen for the Republic. The Molotov–Kuusinen agreement mentioned leasing the Hanko Peninsula, and determining the number of troops to be appointed in a separate agreement. Before the 1990s, historians could only speculate about its existence and content. In 1997, during a joint Finnish-Russian project, Russian professor Oleg Rzesevski discovered the protocol in the Kremlin. The content is quite similar to protocols the Soviet Union signed with Estonia, Latvia and Lithuania in September–October 1939.

== Reaction in Finland and abroad ==
The Finnish Democratic Republic failed to gain support among Finnish workers as the Soviet Union had hoped. Instead, in the face of the invasion, Finnish society became strongly united in what is called the "Spirit of the Winter War". The Democratic Republic also failed to gain any international recognition aside from the Soviet Union itself, although a number of prominent left-wing activists and writers such as Jawaharlal Nehru, George Bernard Shaw, Martin Andersen Nexø and John Steinbeck voiced their support for the government. In Nazi Germany, state newspapers gave their support for the Democratic Republic because of the Molotov–Ribbentrop Pact.

Joseph Stalin was well aware of the domestic political situation in Finland based on Soviet intelligence information, and thus did not anticipate that the establishment of the Democratic Republic would cause any revolutionary action or popular uprisings against the existing Finnish Government.

The Kuusinen Government was officially recognised by the Soviet Union and the Soviet satellite states of the Mongolian People's Republic and the Tuvan People's Republic.

== Dissolution ==
The Soviets had increasingly begun to seek rapprochement with the Finnish government during the course of the Winter War and the Kuusinen regime fell out of favor. Although the Soviets had captured two-thirds of the Karelian Isthmus, casualties were very high and the upcoming spring thaw threatened their offensive. Both sides were exhausted from the war, but the Soviets held the upper hand and successfully pressured the Finns into peace on Soviet terms. On 12 March 1940, the Moscow Peace Treaty was signed between Finland and the Soviet Union, ending hostilities the following morning. By the terms of the treaty, Finland ceded 9% of its territory to the Soviet Union, though the Soviets' attempt to conquer Finland had failed. Subsequently, the Finnish Democratic Republic became obsolete and merged with the Karelian ASSR within the RSFSR to form the new Karelo-Finnish SSR, a Soviet republic in its own right, after Finland had ceded the areas specified in the treaty to the Soviet Union.

== Terijoki government ==
Minister	In office
Chairman of the People's Government and Minister of Foreign Affairs of Finland; Otto Wille Kuusinen	1939.2.12 – 1940.12.3
Assistant Chairman of the People's Government and Minister of Finance; Mauritz Rosenberg	1939.2.12 – 1940.12.3
Minister of Defense; Akseli Anttila	1939.2.12 – 1940.12.3
Minister of Internal Affairs; Tuure Lehén	1939.2.12 – 1940.12.3
Minister of Agriculture; Armas Äikiä	1939.2.12 – 1940.12.3
Minister of Education; Inkeri Lehtinen	1939.2.12 – 1940.12.3
Minister of Karelian Affairs; Paavo Prokkonen	1939.2.12 – 1940.12.3

== See also ==
- Finnish Socialist Workers' Republic, an earlier, independent socialist state which existed for several months in 1918.
- Finland-Soviet Union Peace and Friendship Society
- Latvian Socialist Soviet Republic
- Commune of the Working People of Estonia
