= Anthem of the Georgian Soviet Socialist Republic =

Regional Soviet anthem

Sakartvelos Sabch’ota Sotsialist’uri Resp’ublik’is Sakhelmts’ipo himni
English: State Anthem of the Georgian Soviet Socialist Republic
- საქართველოს საბჭოთა სოციალისტური რესპუბლიკის სახელმწიფო ჰიმნი
- Former regional anthem of the Georgian SSR
- Lyrics: Grigol Abashidze and Alexander Abasheli
- Music: Otar Taktakishvili
- Adopted: 1946; 1956 (with modified lyrics)
- Relinquished: 1990
- Preceded by: "Dideba Zetsit Kurtheuls"
- Succeeded by: "Dideba" (until 2004) "Tavisupleba"

Audio sample
- "Anthem of the Georgian SSR" (post-Stalinist version): file; help

Official orchestral instrumental recording

The State Anthem of the Georgian SSR was a former anthem of Georgia, used between 1946 and 1990, when it was part of the Soviet Union.

== Background ==
The music was composed by Otar Taktakishvili, and the words were written by Grigol Abashidze and Alexander Abasheli. All three stanzas (not including the refrain) in the original lyrics have references to Joseph Stalin, a native Georgian and leader of the Soviet Union at that time. These words were completely removed after Stalin's death as part of Nikita Khrushchev's de-Stalinization program. It is then replaced with new lyrics with no reference to Stalin.

It is one of three Soviet republic national anthems that does not mention the Russian people, the others being the anthems of the Estonian SSR and the Karelo-Finnish SSR. With the latter integrated into the autonomous within Russian SFSR in 1950s, it and Estonia are the only Soviet republics did not mention them in anthem.

== Lyrics ==
The original version was used between 1946 and 1956, and the post-Stalinist version was used from 1956 until the dissolution of the Soviet Union in late 1991.

=== Post-Stalinist version ===
Georgian original

იდიდე მარად, ჩემო სამშობლოვ,
გმირთა კერა ხარ განახლებული,
დიად პარტიის ნათელი აზრით
ლენინის სიბრძნით ამაღლებული.

შენი ოცნება ასრულდა,
რისთვისაც სისხლი ღვარეო,
მშრომელი კაცის მარჯვენით
აყვავებულო მხარეო.

დიდი ოქტომბრის დროშის სხივებმა
შენ გაგინათეს მთები ჭაღარა,
თავისუფლებამ და შემართებამ
გადაგაქციეს მზიურ ბაღნარად.

მოძმე ერების ოჯახში
ამაღლდი, გაიხარეო,
მეგობრობით და გმირობით
გამარჯვებულო მხარეო.

უხსოვარ დროდან ბრწყინავდა შენი
აზრი, ხმალი და გამბედაობა,
დღეს საქართველოს ნათელ მომავალს
სჭედს ლენინური წრთობის თაობა.

კომუნიზმის მზე დაგნათის,
კაშკაშა, მოელვარეო,
იდიდე მრავალჟამიერ,
ჩემო სამშობლო მხარეო.

Romanization of Georgian

Idide marad, chemo samshoblov,
Gmirta k’era khar ganakhlebuli,
Diad P’art’iis nateli azrit
Leninis sibrdznit amaghlebuli.

Sheni otsneba asrulda,
Ristvisats siskhli ghvareo,
Mshromeli k’atsis marjvenit
Aq’vavebulo mkhareo.

Didi Okt’ombris droshis skhivebma
Shen gaginates mtebi ch’aghara,
Tavisuplebam da shemartebam
Gadagaktsies mziur baghnarad.

Modzme erebis ojakhshi
Amaghldi, gaikhareo,
Megobrobit da gmirobit
Gamarjvebulo mkhareo.

Ukhsovar drodan brts’q’inavda sheni
Azri, khmali da gambedaoba,
Dghes Sakartvelos natel momavals
Sch’eds Leninuri ts’rtobis taoba.

K’omunizmis mze dagnatis,
K’ashk’asha, moelvareo,
Idide mravalzhamier,
Chemo samshoblo mkhareo.

IPA transcription

[i.di.dɛ mɑ.ɾɑd t͡ʃʰɛ.mɔ sɑ.mʃɔ.bɫɔβ ‖]
[gmiɾ.tʰɑ k’ɛ.ɾɑ χɑɾ gɑ.nɑ.χlɛ.bu.li ‖]
[di.ɑtʰ p’ɑɾ.t’iːs nɑ.tʰɛ.li ɑ.zɾitʰ]
[lɛ.ni.nis si.bɾd͡z.nitʰ ɑ.mɑ.ʁlɛ.bu.li ‖]

[ʃɛ.ni ɔ.t͡sʰnɛ.bɑ ɑ.sɾuɫ.dɑ ‖]
[ri.stʰʷi.sɑs si.sχli ʁʷɑ.ɾɛ.ɔ |]
[mʃɾɔ.mɛ.li | k’ɑ.t͡sʰis mɑɾ.d͡ʒʷɛ.nitʰ]
[ɑ.q(χ)’ʷɑ.βɛ.bu.ɫɔ mχɑ.ɾɛ.ɔ ‖]

[di.di ɔ.kʰt’ɔ.mbɾis dɾɔ.ʃis sχi.βɛ.bmɑ]
[ʃɛn gɑ.gi.nɑ.tʰɛs mtʰɛ.bi t͡ʃ’ɑ.ʁɑ.ɾɑ |]
[tʰɑ.βi.su.pʰlɛ.bɑm dɑ ʃɛ.mɑɾ.tʰɛ.bɑm]
[gɑ.dɑ.gɑ.kʰt͡sʰi.ɛs mzi.uɾ bɑ.ʁnɑ.ɾɑtʰ ‖]

[mɔ.d͡zmɛ ɛ.ɾɛ.bis ɔ.d͡ʒɑ.χʃi |]
[ɑ.mɑ.ʁɫdi gɑ.i.χɑ.ɾɛ.ɔ |]
[mɛ.gɔ.bɾɔ.bitʰ dɑ gmi.ɾɔ.bitʰ]
[gɑ.mɑɾ.d͡ʒʷɛ.bu.ɫɔ mχɑ.ɾɛ.ɔ ‖]

[uχ.sɔ.βɑɾ dɾɔ.dɑn bɾt͡s’q’i.nɑ.βdɑ ʃɛ.ni]
[ɑ.zɾi χmɑ.li dɑ gɑ.mbɛ.dɑ.ɔ.bɑ |]
[dʁɛs sɑ.kɑɾ.tʰʷɛ.ɫɔs nɑ.tʰɛl mɔ.mɑ.βɑɫs]
[ʃt͡ʃ’ɛd͡z lɛ.ni.nu.ɾi t͡s’ɾ.tʰɔ.bis tʰɑ.ɔ.bɑ ‖]

[k’ɔ.mu.ni.zmis mzɛ dɑ.gnɑ.tʰis |]
[k’ɑ.ʃk’ɑ.ʃɑ mɔ.ɛ.ɫʷɑ.ɾɛ.ɔ |]
[i.di.dɛ mɾɑ.βɑɫ.ʒɑ.mi.ɛɾ |]
[t͡ʃʰɛ.mɔ sɑ.mʃɔ.bɫɔ mχɑ.ɾɛ.ɔ ‖]

English translation

Glory to you forever, my Fatherland,
A new forge of heroes.
By the blessing mind of the Great Party
And Lenin's wisdom, you have risen.

Your dream has come true,
For which you have shed your blood.
A worker's tireless hand
Has led you to prosperity.

The light of Great October's banner
Has lit up your ancient peaks.
Liberty, courage and audace
Have transformed you into a sunny land.

In the family of fraternal peoples
You've reached unachievable heights.
By friendship and nationwide strength,
You have triumphed and will continue so.

Since long ago you have been shining
Your mind, your sword, and your courage.
Now the generation of Lenin's temper forges
Georgia's grandeur and serene future.

The sun of communism is shining
Brighter and brighter over you.
Glory to you forever, my Motherland,
My native land!

Russian translation

Славься в веках, моя Отчизна,
Обновленный очаг героев;
Ты светлым разумом великой партии
И мудростью Ленина возвышена.

Сбылась твоя мечта,
За которую ты кровь проливала,
Неутомимая рука труженика
Тебя к расцвету привела.

Сияние знамен Великого Октября
Озарило твои седые вершины,
Свобода, мужество и доблесть
Превратили тебя в солнечный край.

В братской семье народов
Ты достигла невиданных высот,
Дружбой и силой всенародной
Побеждала ты и побеждаешь.

С незапамятных времен блистали
Твой разум, твой меч и твоя отвага.
Сегодня светлое будущее Грузии
Кует поколение ленинской закалки.

Солнце коммунизма сияет
Все ярче над тобой,
Славься в веках, моя Родина,
Мой край родной!

=== Original lyrics ===
Georgian original

იდიდე მარად, ჩვენო სამშობლოვ,
გმირთა კერა ხარ გაუქრობელი,
ქვეყანას მიეც დიდი სტალინი
ხალხთა მონობის დამამხობელი.

შენი ოცნება ასრულდა,
რისთვისაც სისხლი ღვარეო,
აყვავდი, ტურფა ქვეყანავ
ილხინე, ქართველთ მხარეო.

დიდი ოქტომბრის შუქით ლენინმა
შენ გაგინათა მთები ჭაღარა,
სტალინის სიბრძნემ ძლევით შეგმოსა
გადაგაქცია მზიურ ბაღნარად.

მოძმე ერების ოჯახში
დამკვიდრდი, გაიხარეო,
აყვავდი, ტურფა ქვეყანავ
ილხინე, ქართველთ მხარეო.

უხსოვარ დროდან ბრწყინავდა შენი
აზრი, ხმალი და გამბედაობა,
დღეს შენს დიდებას, ნათელ მომავალს
სჭედს სტალინური წრთობის თაობა.

საბჭოთა დროშა დაგნათის,
მზესავით მოელვარეო,
აყვავდი, ტურფა ქვეყანავ
ილხინე, ქართველთ მხარეო.

Romanization of Georgian

Idide marad, chveno samshoblov,
Gmirta k’era khar gaukrobeli,
Kvekh’anas miec didi St’alini
Khalkhta monobis damamkhobeli.

Sheni ocneba asrulda,
Ristvisac siskhli ghvareo,
Akh’vavdi, t’urpa kvekh’anav
Ilkhine, Kartvelt mkhareo.

Didi Okt’ombris shukit Leninma
Shen gaginata mtebi ch’aghara,
St’alinis sibrdznem dzlevit shegmosa
Gadagakcia mziur baghnarad.

Modzme erebis ojakhshi
Damk’vidrdi, gaikhareo,
Akh’vavdi, t’urpa kvekh’anav
Ilkhine, Kartvelt mkhareo.

Ukhsovar drodan brc’kh’inavda sheni
Azri, khmali da gambedaoba,
Dghes shens didebas, natel momavals
Sch’eds St’alinuri c’rtobis taoba.

Sabch’ota drosha dagnatis,
Mzesavit moelvareo,
Akh’vavdi, t’urpa kvekh’anav
Ilkhine, Kartvelt mkhareo.

IPA transcription

[i.di.dɛ mɑ.ɾɑd | t͡ʃʰʷɛ.nɔ sɑ.mʃɔ.bɫɔβ |]
[gmiɾ.tʰɑ k’ɛ.ɾa χɑɾ gɑ.u.kʰɾɔ.bɛ.li |]
[kʷɛ.q’ɑ.nɑs mi.ɛt͡sʰ di.di st’ɑ.li.ni]
[χɑɫ.χtʰɑ mɔ.nɔ.bis dɑ.mɑ.mχɔ.bɛ.li ‖]

[ʃɛ.ni ɔ.t͡sʰnɛ.bɑ ɑ.sɾul.dɑ |]
[ɾi.stʰʷi.sɑs si.sχli ʁʷɑ.ɾɛ.ɔ |]
[a.q(χ)’ʷɑ.βdi | t’uɾ.pʰɑ kʰʷɛ.q’ɑ.nɑβ]
[i.lχi.nɛ | kʰaɾ.tʰʷɛltʰ mχa.ɾɛ.ɔ ‖]

[di.di ɔ.kʰt’ɔ.mbɾis ʃu.kʰit lɛ.nin.mɑ]
[ʃɛn gɑ.gi.nɑ.tʰɑ mtʰɛ.bi t͡ʃ’ɑ.ʁɑ.ɾɑ |]
[st’ɑ.li.nis si.bɾ.d͡znɛm d͡zlɛ.βitʰ ʃɛ.gmɔ.sɑ]
[gɑ.dɑ.gɑ.kʰt͡sʰi.ɑ mzi.uɾ bɑ.ʁnɑ.ɾɑd ‖]

[mɔ.d͡zmɛ ɛ.ɾɛ.bis ɔ.d͡ʒɑ.χʃi |]
[dɑ.mk’ʷi.dɾ.di | gɑ.i.χɑ.ɾɛ.ɔ |]
[a.q(χ)’ʷɑ.βdi | t’uɾ.pʰɑ kʰʷɛ.q’ɑ.nɑβ]
[i.lχi.nɛ | kʰaɾ.tʰʷɛltʰ mχa.ɾɛ.ɔ ‖]

[u.χsɔ.βɑɾ dɾɔ.dɑn bɾ.t͡s’q’i.nɑ.βnɑ ʃɛ.ni]
[ɑ.zɾi | χmɑ.li dɑ gɑ.mbɛ.dɑ.ɔ.bɑ]
[dʁɛs ʃɛns di.dɛ.bɑs | nɑ.tʰɛl mɔ.mɑ.βɑɫs]
[ʃt͡ʃ’ɛd͡z st’ɑ.li.nu.ɾi t͡s’ɾ.tʰɔ.bis tʰɑ.ɔ.bɑ ‖]

[sɑb.t͡ʃ’ɔ.tʰɑ dɾɔ.ʃɑ dɑ.gnɑ.tʰis |]
[mzɛ.sɑ.βit mɔ.ɛ.ɫʷɑ.ɾɛ.ɔ |]
[a.q(χ)’ʷɑ.βdi | t’uɾ.pʰɑ kʰʷɛ.q’ɑ.nɑβ]
[i.lχi.nɛ | kʰaɾ.tʰʷɛltʰ mχa.ɾɛ.ɔ ‖]

English translation

Be forever glorious, our homeland,
You are an inextinguishable forge of heroes;
You gave the world great Stalin,
Who destroyed the slavery of nations.

Your dream has been accomplished,
For the sake of which you bled:
Blossom, our beautiful country,
Exult, O Georgian land.

With the great light of October,
Lenin has illuminated your ancient mountains;
Stalin's wisdom has made you victorious,
And transformed you into a sunny garden.

In the family of fraternal peoples,
You have gained a foothold, so rejoice!
Blossom, our beautiful country,
Exult, O Georgian land.

Your thought, your sword, and your courage
Have been shining from time immemorial.
Now the generation of Stalin's temper forges
Your grandeur, your serene future.

The Soviet banner, shining like the sun,
Is fluttering over you.
Blossom, our beautiful country,
Exult, O Georgian land.

== Sheet music ==
For symphony orchestra

For smaller composition

== See also ==
- Flag of the Georgian Soviet Socialist Republic
- Coat of arms of the Georgian Soviet Socialist Republic
