= Mindia =

- Opera by Otar Taktakishvili
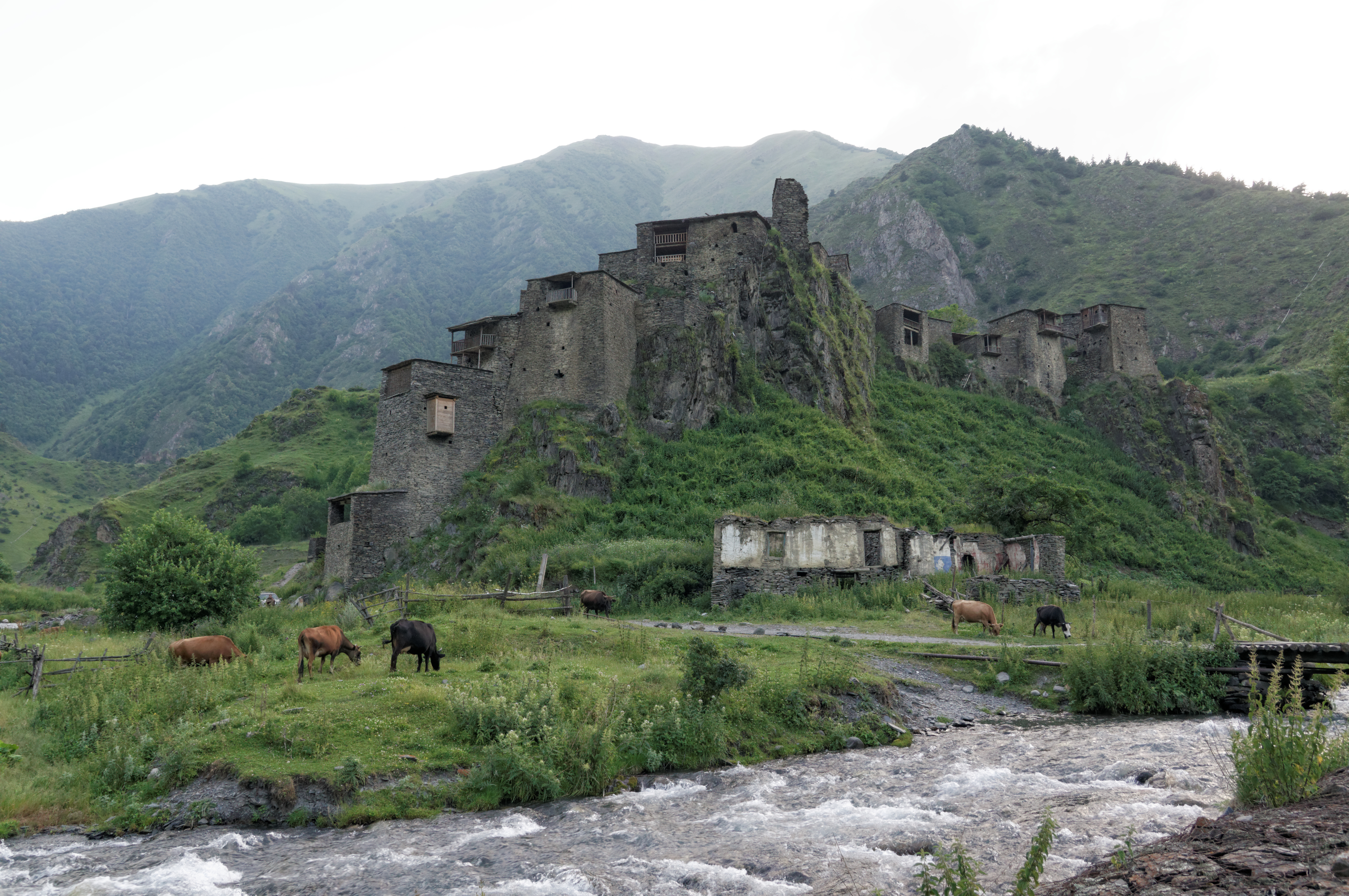
- A mountain village in the Khevsureti region of Georgia, the setting of Mindia
- Librettist: Revas Tabukashvili
- Based on: the epic poem The Snake-eater by Vazha-Pshavela
- Premiere: 23 July 1961; Tbilisi Opera and Ballet Theatre

Mindia is an opera in three acts composed by Otar Taktakishvili to a libretto in Georgian by Revas Tabukashvili. Based on the poem The Snake-eater by Vazha-Pshavela, it premiered on 23 July 1961 at the Tbilisi Opera and Ballet Theatre. The libretto also has versions in Russian and German.

== Background and performance history ==
Mindia was the first of Taktakishvili's six operas and remains the most frequently performed. He chose as his subject Mindia, a hero of Georgian folk myth and the protagonist of The Snake-eater, an epic poem by Vazha-Pshavela written in 1901. Considered Vazha's greatest work, The Snake-eater tells the story of Mindia who consumes a snake and is suddenly conferred with the power to understand the voices of nature. Unable to reconcile his new power with his people's way of life, he ultimately commits suicide. For Vazha he was "an archetype of the poet-shaman unable to coexist with family or community."

The opera premiered at the Tbilisi Opera and Ballet Theatre conducted by Odysseas Dimitriadis on 23 July 1961 coinciding with the centenary of Vazha's birth. As musicologist Maia Sigua points out, the personal "differentness" and pantheism inherent in both the poem and the opera were potentially dangerous themes during the Soviet era. Nevertheless, Mindia went on be performed throughout the Soviet Union. It had its West German premiere at the Saarland State Theatre in Saarbrücken during its 1973–1974 season. The East German premiere followed in 1982 at the Meiningen State Theatre. Mindia continues to be regularly revived at Tbilisi Opera and Ballet Theatre.

== Roles ==
Role	Voice type
Mindia, a young mountain dweller with magic powers	tenor
Msia, Mindia's lover	soprano
Tshalkhia, a mountain dweller, murderer of Mindia's brother	baritone
Khevisberi, Mindia's father and leader of the mountain dwellers	bass
A messenger	bass
Villagers, Voices of Nature

== Synopsis ==
The setting for the opera is the mountains of Khevsureti in the time of Queen Tamar.

In Vazha's poem, Mindia is captured by wizards and held in their lair for several years. Desperate to escape, he tries to commit suicide by eating a snake. Instead of dying, he finds that he has now been conferred with magic powers which allow him to understand the voices of nature–plants, animals, and even waterfalls and mountains. He manages to escape and returns to his native village. It is at this point that the opera begins.

Girls from Mindia's village, including his sweetheart Msia, find him sleeping in a field. Rejoicing at his return, they run off to the village to announce that their hero has returned. Mindia's father, Khevisberi, tells him that in his absence Tshalkhia has killed his brother. According to their tradition, Khevisberi demands that Mindia take "blood revenge" by killing Tshalkhia. However, Mindia's affinity with nature and all life forbids this and he refuses his father's command. The village mocks him as a coward.

Suddenly, the villagers learn that they have been surrounded by invaders. Led by Mindia, they go out to meet the enemy. They return victorious but Khevisberi has been mortally wounded. He expresses as his dying wish that Mindia kill Tshalkhia, as does Msia. Yet again, Mindia refuses. However, when Tshalkhia attacks him, Mindia kills him in self defense. Overcome by remorse, and having lost his magic powers, Mindia leaves the village. Alone in the mountains, he commits suicide with a dagger. The voices of nature return to him as he lies dying.

== Recordings ==
There are two recordings of Mindia, both released on the Melodiya label, a 1963 version in Russian and a 1964 version in Georgian.
