= Otar Taktakishvili =

Georgian composer, teacher and conductor (1924–1989)

- ოთარ თაქთაქიშვილი
- Taktakishvili in the 1970s
- Born: 27 July 1924; Tbilisi, Georgian SSR, Transcaucasian SFSR, USSR
- Died: 21 February 1989 (aged 64); Moscow, Russian SFSR, USSR
- Occupations: composer; conductor; musicologist; teacher
- Years active: 1957–1989

Otar Vasilisdze Taktakishvili (Georgian: ოთარ თაქთაქიშვილი; Russian: Отар Васильевич Тактакишвили; 27 July 1924 – 21 February 1989) was a prominent Georgian composer, teacher, conductor, and musicologist of the Soviet period. Although in the West Taktakishvili is perhaps best known for his 1968 Sonata for Flute and Piano, his works include two symphonies, four piano concertos, two violin concertos, two cello concertos, and operas (Mindia, First Love, The Abduction of the Moon, Mususi, Three Tales). He also wrote several symphonic poems and oratorios, as well as adaptations of Georgian folk songs and a multitude of compositions for instruments and voice.

While still a student at the Tbilisi State Conservatory, Taktakishvili composed the Anthem of the Georgian Soviet Socialist Republic. By 1949 he became a Professor of the Conservatory, as well as the conductor and artistic director of the Georgian State Chorus. In 1951, he received his first Stalin Prize (USSR State Prize) for his First Symphony. In 1962, Taktakishvili became Chairman of the Georgian Composers' Union; and in 1965, the Minister for Culture of the Georgian Republic, until 1983. He was awarded the title of People's Artist of the USSR in 1974, the Lenin Prize in 1982, and the USSR State Prize in 1951, 1952 and 1967. Throughout his career, he also served as a member of the international musical committee of UNESCO, and twice headed the electoral committee for the International Tchaikovsky Competition in Moscow.

== Biography ==
Otar V. Taktakishvili was born and grew up in Tbilisi, Georgia, in a musical family. He was raised by a single mother, noblewoman Elisabed Mikhailis asuli Taktakishvili, who worked as an artist at the Georgian Opera House. As a result of his mother's background Otar had a childhood rich in music. He was also strongly influenced by his uncle Shalva Taktakishvili, who was a composer and a professor at the Tbilisi Conservatory. Shalva was one of the founders of the “Association of Young Georgian String Orchestra", and had authored operas, ballets and chamber works. Otar's other uncle, Giorgi Taktakishvili was a cellist and director of a music school. His uncles were young Otar's first musical guides and influences. From a young age, the composer showed great musical promise, and as a child was able to correctly guess notes played on the piano while blindfolded.

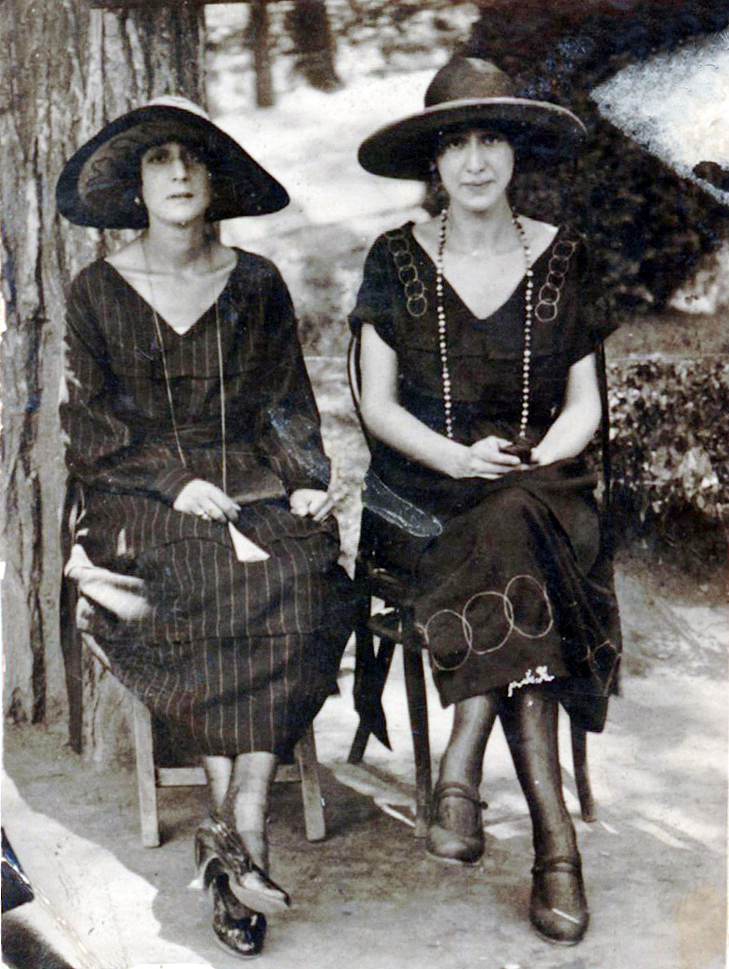
Otar's mother Elizabeth and his aunt in the c. early 1900s

While attending the No42 School on Barnov St. in Tbilisi, Otar started his piano lessons with Tamara V. Bagrationi. He subsequently studied with several piano educators including Militsa K. Korius, Anastasia D. Virasladze, and Evgenia Vasilievna Cherniavskaia, where he met his future wife, Irina Giorgienvna Chirakadze, with whom he lived until the end of his life in 1989. Their romance started at the piano while practicing a piano piece for four hands. At the end of high school, he attended and received a diploma from the Air Force Technicuum until he began his studies at the Tbilisi conservatory.

Soon after entering the conservatory in 1942, while Georgia was at war with Nazi Germany, Taktakishvili composed the Anthem of the Georgian Soviet Socialist Republic. According to the composer's own report, his mother had urged him to enter the contest for the National Anthem after seeing the words to the anthem published in the newspaper. The 19-year-old composer wrote the music “in one try”, submitted his entry and forgot about the contest. He only found out that his music had been selected when he stood outside the concert hall and heard his anthem being played.

Taktakishvili studied at the Tbilisi Conservatory under Aleksandr Gauk, Sergei V. Barchudarian and Andria Balanchivadze. The composer's early influences were Georgian folk music, composers of the classical era, e.g. Mozart, J.S. Bach and Beethoven, and more modern composers, including Alexander Scriabin, Sergei Prokofiev, Dmitri Shostakovich. In his senior year, Taktakishvili had the opportunity to study with Dmitri Shostakovich, and that led to a long-standing collaboration and friendship.

Taktakishvili was survived by his spouse, Irina Chirakadze, who resided in the same apartment on 6 Taktakishvili street (former Riga street) where the composer lived from 1964 until 1989, as well as his son Mikhail O. Taktakishvili, who was a professor of Chemistry, and grandson Otar M. Taktakishvili, who is a physician and a composer, living in New York, And his Great Grandson Otar W. Taktakishvilli living in Ridgefield, Connecticut.

== Works ==
=== Operas ===
- Mindia (based on works of Vazha-Pshavela, 1961)
- Award (Tele-opera, 1964)
- Three Tales, operatic triptychon from three short operas.
- The Abduction of the Moon (Based on the novel of Konstantine Gamsakhurdia, 1977)
- Mususi (The Lady Killer), comic opera (Based on the novel of Mikheil Javakhishvili, 1977)
- First Love (1979)

=== Filmography ===
- 1957 — I Will Say the Truth
- 1982 — The Law of Eternity
- 1984 — Monday - Usual Day

== Awards ==
- People's Artist of the Georgian SSR (1961)
- People's Artist of the USSR (1974)
- Stalin Prize 3rd class (1951) for first symphony
- Stalin Prize 2nd class (1952)
- USSR State Prize (1967)
- Lenin Prize (1982) — For opera: "The Abduction of the Moon" (1977)
- Shota Rustaveli Prize (1987)
- Two Order of Lenin (1966 and 1984)
- Order of the October Revolution (1971)
- Order of the Red Banner of Labour (1958)
- Medals
- Albert Schweitzer Prize (1986)
- Honoured citizen of Tbilisi (1985).

== Sources ==
- Finscher, Ludwig (ed.): Die Musik in Geschichte und Gegenwart, 2nd ed. Stuttgart, Kassel 1994–2007
- Hollfelder, Peter: Die Klaviermusik, Hamburg 1999
- Laux, Karl: Die Musik in Rußland und der Sowjetunion, East-Berlin 1958
