= Armas Äikiä =

Finnish writer

- Born: 1904; Pyhäjärvi, Grand Duchy of Finland, Russian Empire
- Died: 1965 (aged 60–61)

Armas Äikiä (1904–1965) was a Finnish communist writer and journalist. He wrote the Anthem of Karelo-Finnish SSR.

In Finland, when the Communist Party was banned, he spent the years 1927–1928 and 1930–1935 in prison, where he wrote defiant poems. Freed with a conditional release in 1935, he fled across the border to the Soviet Union, which led to the loss of his Finnish citizenship.

During the Winter War, Äikiä served as Minister of Agriculture for the short-lived Finnish Democratic Republic. He had several collection of poems published in the Soviet Union. He returned to Finland in 1947, but having lost his citizenship could not participate in politics, working as a reporter instead.

Äikiä's funeral took place at Malmi Cemetery in Helsinki under tight police protection, attended by leaders of the party Aimo Aaltonen, Ville Pessi and president Urho Kekkonen. Äikiä is buried in a communal grave of Finnish Communist Party members.

== Bibliography of works ==
- Vallankumousrunoja, 1928 (anthology with other writers)
- Kaksi Soturia, 1941 (published in Petroskoi, U.S.S.R.)
- Laulu Kotkasta, 1941 (published in Petroskoi)
- Tulikehässä, 1943 (published in Petroskoi)
- Iskelmiä, 1943 (published in Petroskoi)
- Kalterilyyra, 1945 (published in Petroskoi)
- Tulikantele, 1947 (published in Petroskoi)
- Henkipatto, 1948 (published in Finland by Kansankulttuuri)
- Kolmas Tie, 1948
- Vladimir Majakovski, 1950
- Lotta Hilpeläinen, 1952 (as Viljo Veijo)
- Sinisten Silmien Tähden, 1952 (as Viljo Veijo)
- Tänään ja Vuonna 1965, 1959
- Laulaja Tulvoren Juurella, 1962
- Stihotvorenija, 1963
