= Grigol Abashidze =

Georgian poet

- გრიგოლ აბაშიძე
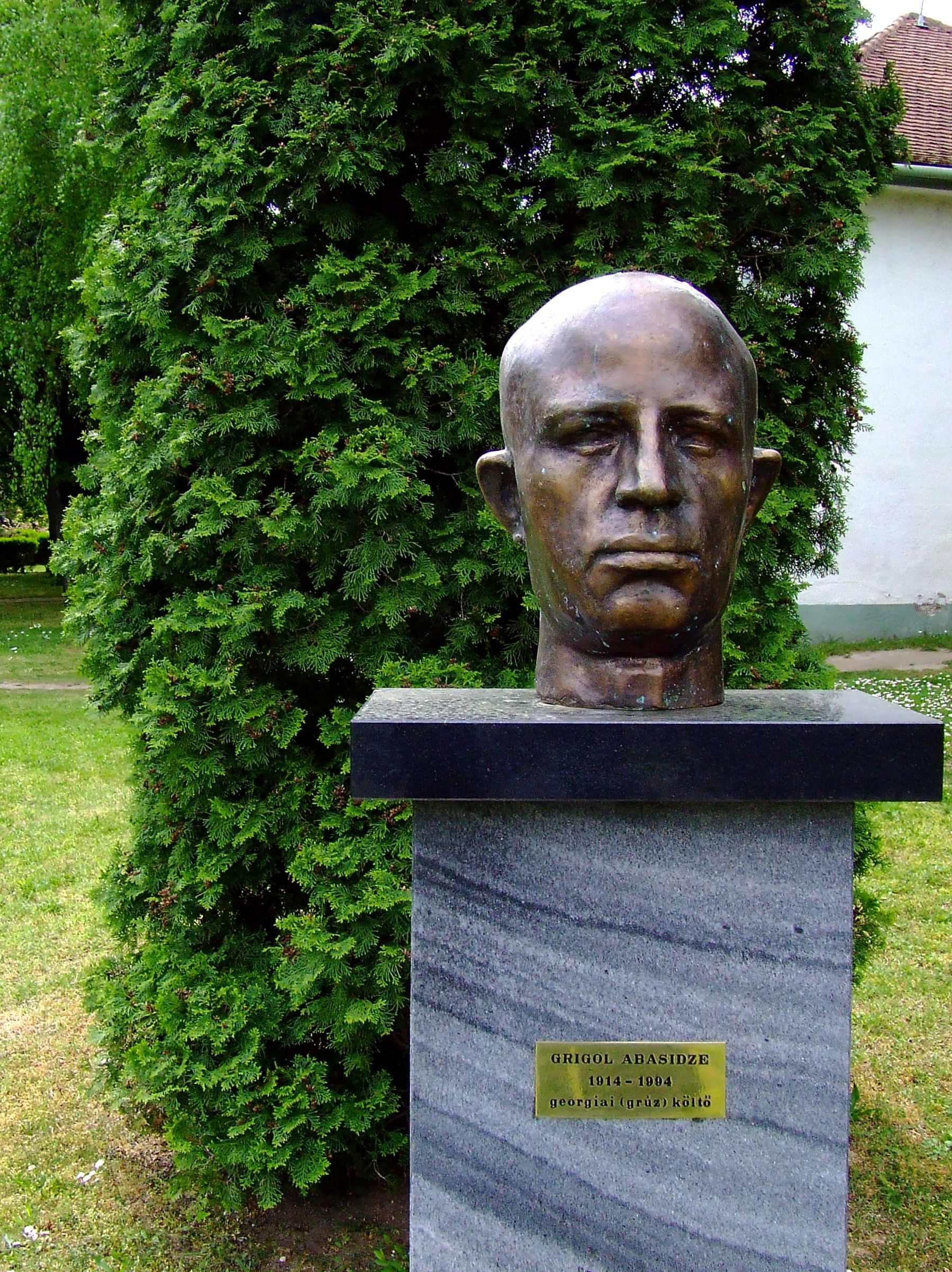
- Bust of Abashidze in Kiskőrös
- Born: 1 August 1914; Chiatura, Kutais Governorate, Russian Empire
- Died: 29 July 1994 (aged 79); Tbilisi, Georgia
- Education: Tbilisi State University
- Occupation: Poet
- Writing career
- Pen name: Grigory
- Notable work: Forever in Armor
- Notable awards: Stalin Prize; Hero of Socialist Labour
- Movement: Communism

Grigol Abashidze, (Georgian: გრიგოლ აბაშიძე; Russian: Григол (Григорий) Григорьевич Абашидзе; 1 August 1914 – 29 July 1994) or Grigory for short, was a Georgian poet known for works featuring Communist influences.

== Early life ==
Abashidze was born on 1 August 1914 [O.S. 19 July] in Chiatura, Georgia. He studied at the Tbilisi State University Faculty of Philology, where he graduated in 1936. In 1944, he joined the Communist Party of the Soviet Union (CPSU) and remained a lifelong member.

== Literary life ==
Abashidze entered the literary scene in 1934 when his first work was published. Abashidze usually portrayed the common Soviet man in his works, like labourers and farmers. There was, too, the man who contributed to communism, like in his story "Forever in Armor" (1938) and 'The Founder' (1939).

Abashidze's reputation soared during the Patriotic War, when he brought out works such as "The Enemies" (1941), "The Duel of the Tanks" (1941), "The Banners" (1943), and "The Unconquerable Caucasus" (1943).

His "On the Southern Frontier" (1949) and "Lenin in Samgori" (1950) won him the State Prize of the USSR in 1951. His poem "George the Sixth" (1942) captures Georgia's struggle for independence. He wrote two other narrative poems, "The Legend of the First Dwellers in Tbilisi" (1959) and "Journey Into Three Times" (1961). He has also written two historical novels, Lasharela (1957) and The Long Night, which depict life in 13th-century Georgia.

In 1967, Abashidze became the first secretary of the board of the Union of Writers of Georgia.
