= Otto Kuusinen =

Finnish-Soviet revolutionary and politician (1881–1964)

Otto Wille Kuusinen
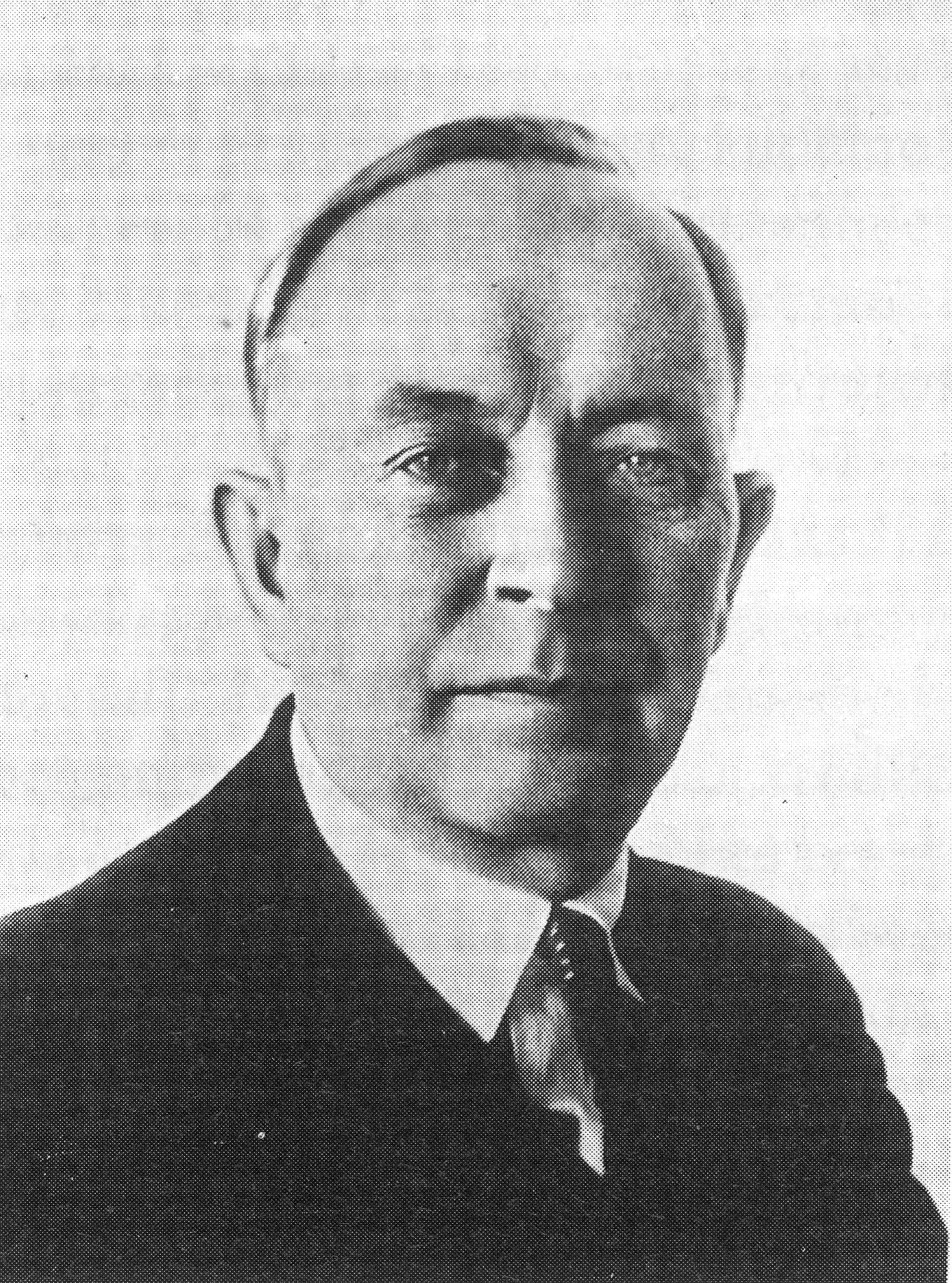
- Portrait, c. 1940s

Chairman of the People's Government of the Finnish Democratic Republic
- In office 1 December 1939 – 12 March 1940

Chairman of the Presidium of the Supreme Soviet of the Karelo-Finnish SSR
- In office 11 July 1940 – 16 July 1956

Member of the 19th Presidium
- In office 16 October 1952 – 5 March 1953

Member of the 20th–21st, 22nd Secretariat
- In office 29 June 1957 – 17 May 1964

Personal details
- Born: 4 October 1881 Laukaa, Grand Duchy of Finland, Russian Empire
- Died: 17 May 1964 (aged 82) Moscow, Russian SFSR, Soviet Union
- Resting place: Kremlin Wall Necropolis, Moscow
- Party: Social Democratic Party of Finland (1906–1918); Communist Party of Finland (1918–1964); Communist Party of the Soviet Union (1918–1964)
- Children: 8, including Hertta Kuusinen

Otto Wilhelm "Wille" Kuusinen (Finnish: [ˈotːo ˈʋilːe ˈkuːsinen]; Russian: О́тто Вильге́льмович Ку́усинен, romanized: Otto Vilgelmovich Kuusinen; 4 October 1881 – 17 May 1964) was a Finnish-born Soviet politician, literary historian, and poet.

From 1911 to 1917, Kuusinen served as Chairman of the Social Democratic Party of Finland and became one of the leaders of the Finnish Socialist Workers' Republic in 1918. After the defeat of the Reds in the Finnish Civil War, he fled to Soviet Russia.

In the Soviet Union, Kuusinen became a prominent official in Comintern. During the Winter War (1939–1940), he led the Finnish Democratic Republic, a short-lived Soviet puppet state. Following the war, he served as the head of state of the Karelo-Finnish SSR from 1940 until 1956. He was a member of the Politburo in 1952–1953 and 1957–1964.

== Early life and education ==
Kuusinen was born on 4 October 1881, to the family of village tailor Wilhelm Juhonpoika Kuusinen in Laukaa, Grand Duchy of Finland, Russian Empire. Otto's mother died when he was two years old, and the family then moved to Jyväskylä. In May 1900, Kuusinen graduated from the Jyväskylä Lyceum and entered Helsinki University the same year. His main subjects were philosophy, aesthetics, and art history. Kuusinen was an active member of the students' union, and during this period he was interested in Fennoman conservatism and Alkioism. In 1902, Kuusinen graduated as a candidate of philosophy.

== Career ==
=== Finnish Civil War and flight to the Soviet Union ===
In 1906, after toppling the more moderate party chairman J. K. Kari, Kuusinen came to dominate Finland's Social Democratic Party. He was a member of Finland's Parliament from 1908 to 1910, from 1911 to 1913 and again from 1916 to 1918 as well as the party's chairman from 1911 to 1917. He was a leader of the January 1918 revolution in Finland that created the short-lived Finnish Socialist Workers' Republic, of which he was appointed People's Commissar of Education. After the republic was defeated in the Finnish Civil War in 1918, Kuusinen fled to Moscow and helped form the Finnish Communist Party.

Kuusinen continued his work as a prominent leader of the Comintern in Bolshevist Russia, that soon became the Soviet Union. Kuusinen also became a leader in Soviet military intelligence, establishing an intelligence network against the Scandinavian countries. In Finland, a more moderate faction rehabilitated the Social Democrats under Väinö Tanner's leadership. Meanwhile, Kuusinen and other radicals were increasingly seen as responsible for the Civil War and its aftermath.

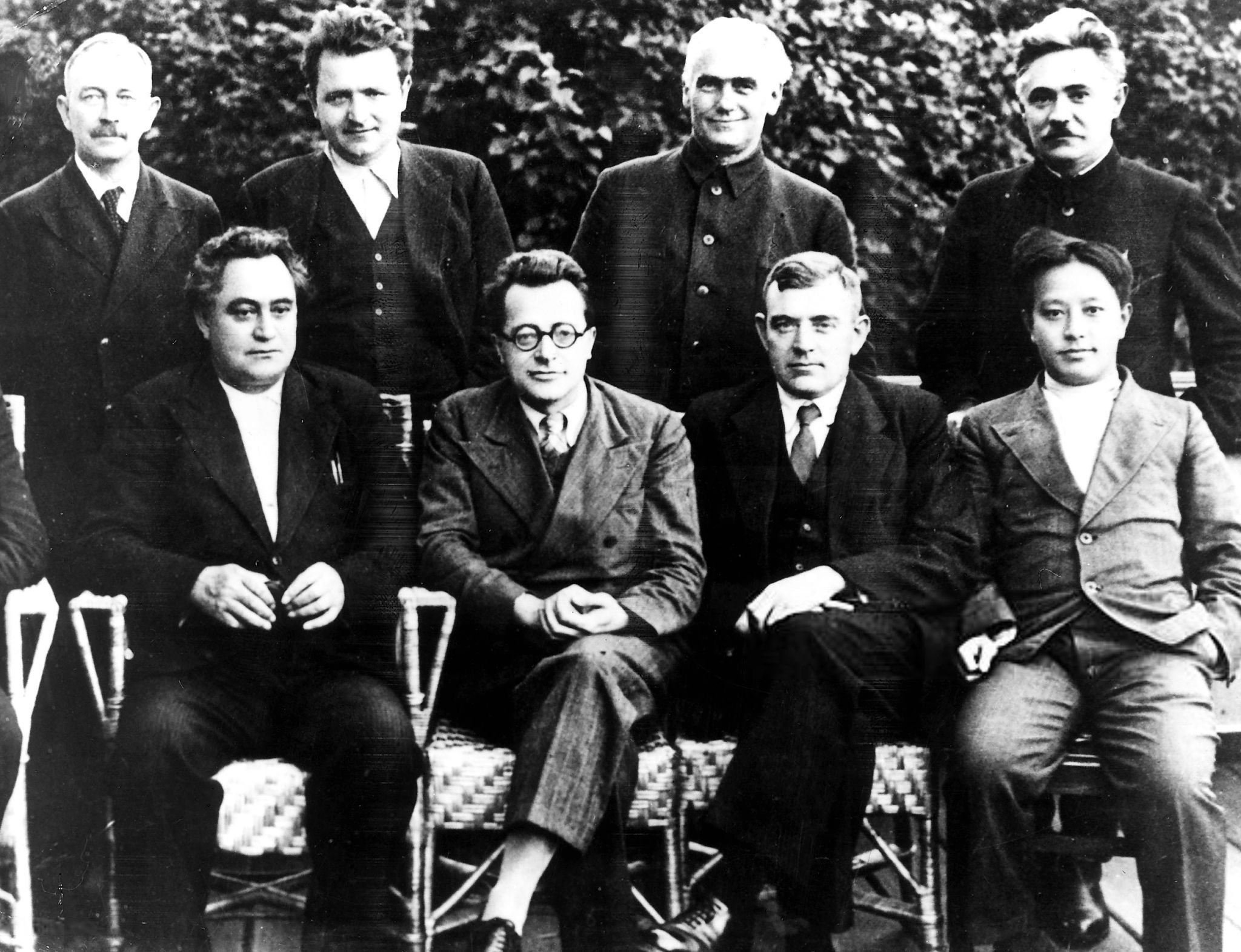
Members of the Executive Committee of the Comintern at the 7th World Congress, 1935. Seated (L-R): Georgi Dimitrov, Palmiro Togliatti, Wilhelm Florin, Wang Ming. Standing: Otto Kuusinen, Dmitry Manuilsky, Klement Gottwald, Wilhelm Pieck.

Animosity towards socialists in Finland in the decades after the civil war prompted many Finns to emigrate to Russia to "build socialism." However, the Soviet Great Purge was a hard blow to Finns in the Soviet Union. Many Finnish communists sympathetic to Trotskyism or social democracy were purged and Kuusinen's reputation in Finland was damaged when he turned out to be one of the very few not targeted by Stalinist show trials, deportations, and executions.

=== Head of the Terijoki Government ===
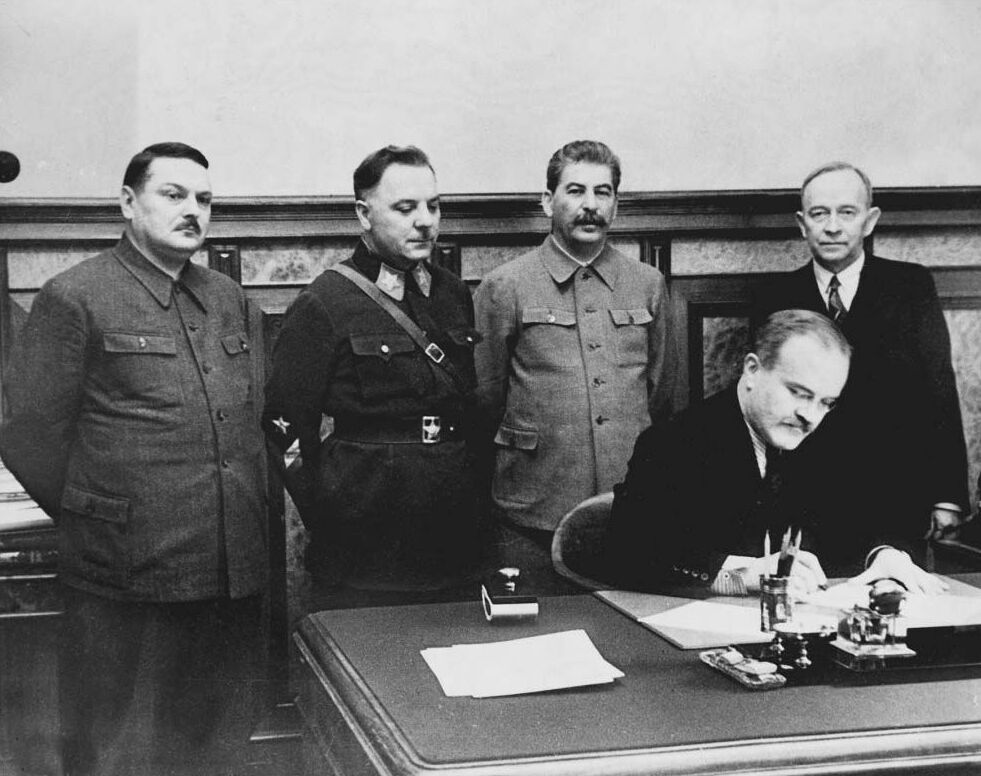
The Soviet leadership signed a treaty with the Finnish Democratic Republic. Standing, from left to right are Andrei Zhdanov, Kliment Voroshilov, Stalin, and Kuusinen. Seated is Vyacheslav Molotov.

When the Red Army began its advance during the Winter War on November 30, 1939, Kuusinen was pronounced head of the Finnish Democratic Republic (also known as the Terijoki Government)—Joseph Stalin's puppet regime through which Finland would be transformed into a socialist state. A "Declaration of the People's Government of Finland" was issued in Terijoki on December 1, 1939, and a "Treaty of Mutual Assistance and Friendship Between the Soviet Union and the Democratic Republic of Finland" signed by Molotov and Kuusinen in Moscow on December 2, 1939. However, the war did not go as planned, and the Soviet leadership decided to negotiate a peace with the legitimate Finnish government; Kuusinen's government disbanded and he was made chairman of the presidium of the Supreme Soviet of the Karelo-Finnish SSR (1940–1956).

Finnish Communist Arvo Tuominen expressed the opinion that the war was not Kuusinen's idea. According to him, Kuusinen would have known that the underground Finnish Communist Party was in shambles due to police terror and could not incite a mass revolt in Finland or mutiny in the ranks of the army. The number of soldiers who joined Kuusinen's Finnish People's Army was up to 25000 Ingrians, Karelians, Russians, and some Finnish émigrés. Kuusinen served as chairman and foreign minister of the Terijoki puppet government, while its other ministers were members of the Finnish Communist Party. The Treaty of Mutual Assistance between the government of the Soviet Union and the Terijoki puppet government, signed in Moscow in December 1939, indicates that the puppet government's members were accepted by the leaders of the Soviet Union. The first idea of the Terijoki puppet government might have been expressed to Joseph Stalin by the Finnish Communist Party or Soviet Communist Party secretary Andrei Zhdanov in the beginning of November, because the main secretary of the Finnish Communist Party, Arvo Tuominen, received a letter dated November 13 in Stockholm concerning this matter.

The Finnish Communist Party had little influence during the 1930s and most working class Finns stood behind the legal government in Helsinki. Finnish national unity against the Soviet invasion was later called the Spirit of the Winter War.

=== Politburo member ===
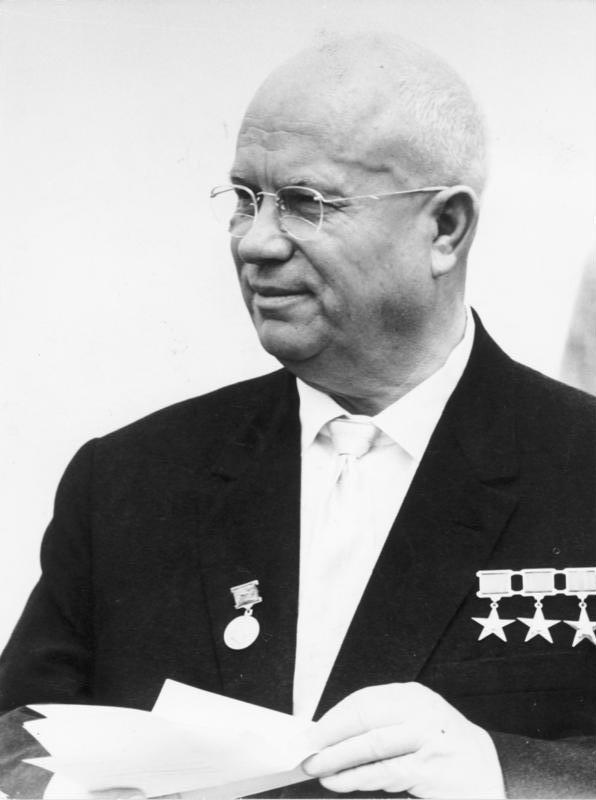
Kuusinen served both under the Stalin era and under Nikita Khrushchev.

Kuusinen became an influential official in the Soviet administration. He was a member of the Politburo, the highest organ of the Communist party. Despite his close work with Stalin, Kuusinen was able to continue to work during the administration of Nikita Khrushchev (1953–1964) and "de-Stalinization". He was Secretary of the Central Committee of the Communist Party of the Soviet Union 1957–1964. In 1952 and again in 1957 he was also elected to the Presidium of the Central Committee.

In the 1950s, Kuusinen was also one of the editors of The Fundamentals of Marxism-Leninism, a textbook considered to be one of the fundamental works on dialectical materialism and Leninist communism.

In 1958, Kuusinen was elected a member of the Soviet Academy of Sciences.

After learning that he was terminally ill, Kuusinen requested (via the Soviet Embassy in Helsinki) permission to visit Laukaa and Jyväskylä as a private person. The government of Finland denied this request.

== Personal life and death ==
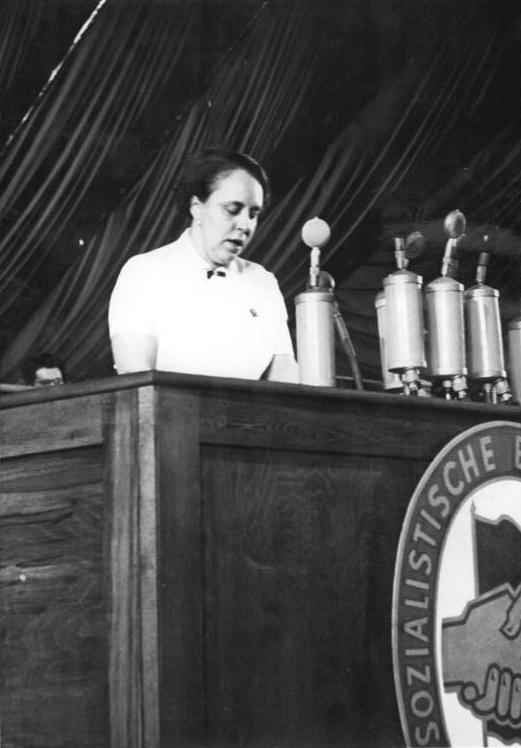
Daughter Hertta Kuusinen in East Berlin for 3rd congress of the Socialist Unity Party of Germany (1950)

Kuusinen was married several times and had several children: Aino Elina (born 1901), Hertta Elina (born 1904), Esa Otto Wille (born 1906), Riikka-Sisko (born 1908), Heikki (born 1911) and Taneli (born 1913). Most of his offspring remained with his first wife Saima Dahlström. In early 1920s Kuusinen married Aino Sarola. In 1936, he fell in love with an Armenian, Marina Amiragova, who was 30 years younger than him. They stayed together until Kuusinen's death and never married. They had a daughter in 1937 who died at the age of eleven months.

Kuusinen died age 82 on 17 May 1964 in Moscow. His ashes were buried in the Kremlin Wall Necropolis.

He was succeeded by his daughter Hertta Kuusinen, a leading communist politician in Finland during the Cold War.

== Legacy ==
Under Kuusinen's name came the Comintern concept of a politically organized "solar system" in an influential piece called "Report of the Commission for Work among the Masses" (1926):

The first of our task is to build up, not only communist organisations, but other organisations as well, above all mass organisations sympathising with our aims, and able to aid us for special purposes. We have already such organisations in some countries, for instance the International Red Aid, the Workers' International Relief, etc. Comrade Zinoviev has expressly emphasised the importance of this task in his closing speech. Besides this we require a number of more or less firmly established organisatory fulcrums, which we can utilise for our further work, ensuring that we are not condemned to the Sisyphus-like task of only influencing the masses politically, only to see this mass influence constantly slip through our hands. We must create a whole solar system of organisations and smaller committees around the Communist Party, so to speak, smaller organisations working actually under the influence of our Party (not under mechanical leadership).

The quote "solar system of organizations" was wrongly ascribed to Lenin by U.S. HUAC chief investigator Robert E. Stripling and U.S. Attorney General Francis Biddle.

== Works ==
Books by Kuusinen include:

- Finland unmasked: 25 years of anti-Soviet policy (1944)
- Fundamentals of Marxism-Leninism (1960)

Articles by Kuusinen include:

- "Under the Leadership of Russia" (1924)
- "A Misleading Description of the 'German October" (1925)
- "Report of the Commission for Work among the Masses" (1926)
- "A Warmongers' International" (1951)

== See also ==
- Kullervo Manner
