= List of Heroes of the Soviet Union (V) =

The Hero of the Soviet Union was the highest distinction of the Soviet Union. It was awarded 12,775 times. Due to the large size of the list, it has been broken up into multiple pages.

This color, along with the † (dagger), indicates that the title was awarded posthumously.

== Military personnel ==
Name	Unit	Rank	Date of award	Notes
Aleksey Vavilin; Russian: Алексей Сергеевич Вавилин	1087th Infantry Regiment	Lieutenant	16 October 1943 †	Killed in action on 28 August 1943
Anatoly Vavilov; Russian: Анатолий Георгиевич Вавилов	1334th Anti-aircraft Artillery Regiment	Junior Sergeant	9 February 1944	—
Sergey Vavilov; Russian: Сергей Васильевич Вавилов	606th Infantry Regiment	Junior Commissar	22 February 1943 †	Killed in action on 18 November 1941
Aleksandr Vaganov; Russian: Александр Васильевич Ваганов	68th Guards Tank Regiment	Guard Captain	31 May 1945	—
Aleksandr Vaganov; Russian: Александр Дмитриевич Ваганов	383rd Infantry Regiment	Staff Sergeant	17 October 1943	—
Ivan Vaganov; Russian: Иван Семёнович Ваганов	69th Mechanized Brigade	Colonel	31 May 1945	—
Viktor Vagin; Russian: Виктор Андрианович Вагин	26th Separate Guards Heavy Tank Regiment	Guard Starshina	24 March 1945 †	Killed in action on 21 June 1944
Leonid Vagin; Russian: Леонид Иванович Вагин	79th Guards Infantry Division	Guard Major-General	6 April 1945	—
Sergey Vagin; Russian: Сергей Тимофеевич Вагин	175th Guards Assault Aviation Regiment	Guard Junior Lieutenant	15 May 1946	—
Aleksandr Vagurin; Russian: Александр Андреевич Вагурин	128th Mortar Regiment	Major	17 October 1943	—
Viktor Bazhenin; Russian: Виктор Михайлович Важенин	216th Guards Infantry Regiment	Guard Lieutenant Colonel	24 March 1945	—
Mikhail Bazhenin; Russian: Михаил Иванович Важенин	4th Guards Airborne Regiment	Red Army Guard	10 January 1944	—
Ivan Bazhenin; Russian: Иван Васильевич Важеркин	30th Infantry Regiment	Sergeant	15 January 1944	—
Aleksandr Vazhensky; Russian: Александр Григорьевич Важинский	6th Bomber Aviation Regiment	Major	27 June 1945	—
Gimazetdin Vazetdinov; Tatar: Гыймазетдин Вәҗетдинов	330th Infantry Regiment	Junior Lieutenant	21 March 1940 †	Killed in action on 8 March 1940
Stepan Vayda; Russian: Степан Николаевич Вайда; Czech: Vajda Stěpan	1st Separate Czechoslovak Tank Brigade	Captain	10 August 1945 †	Killed in action on 6 April 1945
Yevsei Vainrub; Russian: Евсей Григорьевич Вайнруб	219th Tank Brigade	Lieutenant Colonel	6 April 1945	—
Matvei Vainrub; Russian: Матвей Григорьевич Вайнруб	8th Guards Army	Guard Major-General	6 April 1945	—
Boris Vaynsteyn; Russian: Борис Яковлевич Вайнштейн	206th Infantry Regiment	Captain	15 May 1946 †	Killed in action on 6 December 1944
Vladimir Vayser; Russian: Владимир Зельманович Вайсер	111th Tank Brigade	Junior Lieutenant	25 August 1944 †	Killed in action on 20 December 1943
Izot Vakarin; Russian: Изот Антонович Вакарин	940th Infantry Regiment	Senior Lieutenant	4 June 1944	—
Isaak Vaksman; Russian: Исаак Фёдорович Ваксман	1118th Infantry Regiment	Senior Lieutenant	22 February 1944	—
Aleksandr Vakulsky; Russian: Александр Васильевич Вакульский	949th Assault Aviation Regiment	Captain	29 June 1945	—
Abdulla Valiev; Bashkir: Абдулла Хәбибулла улы Вәлиев	1031th Infantry Regiment	Red Army Man	17 October 1943	—
Agzam Valev; Tatar: Әгъзам Вәлиев	179th Fighter Aviation Regiment	Major	15 May 1946	—
Salikh Valiev; Tatar: Салих Вәлиев	957th Infantry Regiment	Junior Lieutenant	23 October 1943	—
Stepan Valenteev; Russian: Степан Елисеевич Валентеев	363th Infantry Regiment	Corporal	21 July 1944	—
Dmitry Valentsik; Belarusian: Дзмітрый Данілавіч Валенцік	5th Separate High-speed Bomber Aviation Regiment	Captain	7 May 1940	—
Akram Valiev; Tatar: Әкрам Вәлиев	341th Guards Infantry Regiment	Guard Staff Sergeant	24 March 1945	—
Gabdelakhat Valiev; Tatar: Габделәхәт Вәлиев	91st Guards Infantry Regiment	Guard Staff Sergeant	16 May 1944 †	Killed in action on 18 April 1944
Ivan Valukhov; Russian: Иван Семёнович Валухов	334th Long-range Aviation Regiment	Captain	19 August 1944	—
Vasily Valkov; Ukrainian: Василь Матвійович Вальков	307th Infantry Regiment	Lieutenant Colonel	27 June 1945 †	Killed in action on 24 April 1945
Nikolai Valyaev; Russian: Николай Дмитриевич Валяев	842nd Infantry Regiment	Junior Lieutenant	13 November 1943	—
Mikhail Valyansky; Russian: Михаил Яковлевич Валянский	932nd Infantry Regiment	Junior Lieutenant	15 May 1946	—
Manzus Vanakhun; Russian: Манзус Ванахун	232nd Mortar Regiment	Sergeant	8 September 1943 †	Killed in action on 5 July 1943
Ivan Vanin; Russian: Иван Иванович Ванин	986th Infantry Regiment	Senior Lieutenant	31 May 1945	—
Nikolai Vanin; Russian: Николай Андреевич Ванин	696th Anti-Tank Fighter Artillery Regiment	Staff Sergeant	24 March 1945	—
Fyodor Vanin; Russian: Фёдор Варламович Ванин	836th Infantry Regiment	Captain	29 October 1943	—
Vladimir Vanichkin; Russian: Владимир Васильевич Ваничкин	271th Guards Infantry Regiment	Guard Lieutenant	24 March 1945	—
Ivan Vanichkin; Russian: Иван Дмитриевич Ваничкин	174th Guards Infantry Regiment	Guard Staff Sergeant	13 September 1944	—
Pavel Vansetsky; Russian: Павел Фёдорович Вансецкий	384th Separate Marine Corps Battalion of the Black Sea Fleet	Starshina 2nd Class	20 April 1945 †	Killed in action on 27 March 1944
Pyotr Vantsin; Russian: Пётр Андреевич Ванцин	415th Infantry Regiment	Lieutenant	10 April 1945	—
Vachagan Vantsyan; Russian: Вачаган Унанович Ванцян	259th Infantry Regiment	Sergeant	24 March 1945 †	Died of wounds on 1 August 1944
Mikhail Vanyushkin; Russian: Михаил Степанович Ванюшкин	18th Tank Regiment 47th Mechanized Brigade	Senior Lieutenant	29 June 1945 †	Killed in action on 8 February 1945
Boris Varava; Russian: Борис Семёнович Варава	156th Separate Anti-Tank Fighter Division	Sergeant	10 April 1945 †	Killed in action on 29 January 1945
Grigory Varava; Russian: Григорий Андреевич Варава	200th Guards Light Artillery Regiment	Guard Staff Sergeant	17 October 1943	—
Nikolai Varakin; Russian: Николай Григорьевич Варакин	483th Separate Sapper Battalion	Starshina	31 May 1945 †	Killed in action on 28 March 1945
Valentin Varennikov; Russian: Валентин Иванович Варенников	First Deputy Chief of General Staff of the Armed Forces of the USSR	Army General	3 March 1988	—
Ivan Varepa; Russian: Иван Иосифович Варепа	218th Guards Infantry Regiment	Guard Junior Sergeant	15 January 1944	—
Nikolai Varlamov; Russian: Николай Гаврилович Варламов	239th Infantry Regiment	Sergeant	25 September 1943 †	Killed in action on 25 July 1943
Gevork Vartanian; Armenian: Գևորգ Վարդանյան	Intelligence Officer of the Committee of State Security	Colonel	28 May 1984	—
Garnik Vartanian; Armenian: Գառնիկ Վարդումյան	459th Mortar Regiment	Lieutenant	27 June 1945	—
Karl Varfolomeev; Russian: Карп Петрович Варфоломеев	21st Separate Pontoon-Bridge Battalion	Red Army Man	17 October 1943	—
Nikolai Varchuk; Russian: Николай Изотович Варчук	737th Fighter Aviation Regiment	Major	28 September 1943	—
Andrey Varyukhin; Russian: Андрей Петрович Варюхин	47th Infantry Regiment	Colonel	24 March 1945	—
Nikolai Varyagov; Russian: Николай Петрович Варягов	530th Anti-tank Fighter Regiment	Senior Lieutenant	27 June 1945	—
Mikhail Vasev; Russian: Михаил Александрович Васев	23rd Guards Separate Tank Brigade	Guard Lieutenant	3 June 1944	—
Grigory Vasev; Russian: Григорий Тимофеевич Васёв	165th Guards Assault Aviation Regiment	Guard Senior Lieutenant	18 August 1945	—
Ivan Vasenev; Russian: Иван Трофимович Васенев	116th Artillery Regiment	Captain	10 April 1945	—
Mikhail Vasenkov; Russian: Михаил Анатольевич Васенков	KGB	Colonel	12 January 1990	—
Stepan Vasechko; Russian: Степан Павлович Васечко	95th Guards Infantry Regiment	Red Army Guard	24 March 1945	—
Vladimir Vasilyevsky; Russian: Владимир Гаврилович Василевский	30th Reconnaissance Aviation Regiment	Captain	5 November 1944	—
Yegor Vasilyevsky; Russian: Егор Васильевич Василевский	151st Guards Fighter Aviation Regiment	Guard Captain	15 May 1946	—
Pyotr Vasilyevsky; Russian: Пётр Лукьянович Василевский	269th Infantry Regiment	Senior Lieutenant	29 June 1945	—
Gavriil Vasilenko; Russian: Гавриил Тарасович Василенко	101st Infantry Regiment	Senior Lieutenant	7 April 1940	—
Ivan Vasilenko; Russian: Иван Андреевич Василенко	102nd Infantry Regiment	Captain	31 May 1945	—
Konstantin Vasilenko; Russian: Константин Петрович Василенко	102nd Guards Infantry Regiment	Guard Junior Lieutenant	24 March 1945	—
Mikhail Vasilenko; Russian: Михаил Абрамович Василенко	1137th Light Artillery Regiment	Junior Lieutenant	31 May 1945	—
Mikola Vasilenko; Ukrainian: Микола Григорович Василенко	936th Infantry Regiment	Red Army Man	13 September 1944	—
Sergey Vasilenko; Russian: Сергей Иосифович Василенко	312th Assault Aviation Regiment	Senior Lieutenant	26 October 1944	—
Fyodor Vasilenko; Russian: Фёдор Емельянович Василенко	10th Guards Long-Range Aviation Regiment	Guard Captain	13 March 1944	—
Sergey Vasilisin; Russian: Сергей Дмитриевич Василисин	325th Infantry Regiment	Comissar	16 January 1942 †	Killed in action on 2 August 1941
Mikhail Vasilishin; Russian: Михаил Иванович Василишин	175th Guards Infantry Regiment	Guard Corporal	27 June 1945	—
Nikolai Vasilishin; Russian: Николай Яковлевич Василишин	68th Separate Sapper Battalion	Corporal	10 April 1945	—
Aleksandr Makarovich Vasilyev; Russian: Александр Макарович Васильев	81st Infantry Regiment	Junior Commander	26 January 1940	—
Aleksandr Matveevich Vasilyev; Russian: Александр Матвеевич Васильев	173rd Guards Assault Aviation Regiment	Guard Major	15 May 1946	—
Aleksandr Fyodorovich Vasilyev; Russian: Александр Фёдорович Васильев	11th Light Tank Brigade	Senior Lieutenant	29 August 1939	—
Aleksey Vasilyev; Russian: Алексей Александрович Васильев	340th Long-Range Aviation Regiment	Senior Lieutenant	29 June 1945	—
Anatoly Vasilyev; Russian: Анатолий Николаевич Васильев	198th Assault Aviation Regiment	Captain	26 October 1944	—
Andrey Vasilyev; Russian: Андрей Александрович Васильев	269th Infantry Regiment	Staff Sergeant	10 January 1944	—
Boris Vasilyev; Russian: Борис Михайлович Васильев	44th Fighter Aviation Division	Senior Comissar	20 November 1941	—
Vasily Vasilyevich Vasilyev; Russian: Василий Васильевич Васильев	42nd Long-Range Aviation Regiment	Captain	13 March 1944 †	Killed in action on 8 September 1943
Vasily Ivanovich Vasilyev; Russian: Василий Иванович Васильев	53rd Guards Tank Brigade	Guard Lieutenant	10 April 1945	—
Vasily Semyonovich Vasilyev; Russian: Василий Семёнович Васильев	1964th Anti-Tank Fighter Regiment	Lieutenant	24 March 1945 †	Killed in action on 9 August 1944
Vladimir Aleksandrovich Vasilyev; Russian: Владимир Александрович Васильев	130th Guards Infantry Regiment	Guard Sergeant	31 March 1943 †	Killed in action on 15 January 1943
Vladimir Andreevich Vasilyev; Russian: Владимир Андреевич Васильев	342nd Infantry Regiment	Lieutenant	29 June 1945 †	Killed in action on 28 March 1945
Vladimir Vasilyevich Vasilyev; Russian: Владимир Васильевич Васильев	1st Guards Cavalry Regiment	Guard Staff Sergeant	27 June 1945 †	Killed in action on 24 January 1945
Grigory Dmitrievich Vasilyev; Russian: Григорий Дмитриевич Васильев	1st Guards Mine-Torpedo Aviation Regiment	Guard Captain	22 February 1944	—
Grigory Semyonovich Vasilyev; Russian: Григорий Семёнович Васильев	605th Infantry Regiment	Lieutenant Colonel	28 April 1943 †	Killed in action on 28 January 1943
Dmitry Vasilyev; Russian: Дмитрий Павлович Васильев	50th Guards Cavalry Regiment	Guard Captain	25 August 1944 †	Killed in action on 31 January 1944
Ivan Vasilyev; Russian: Иван Васильевич Васильев	1st Guards Army	Guard Major-General	29 June 1945 †	Killed in action on 7 August 1944
Ivan Vasilyev; Russian: Иван Васильевич Васильев	713th Self-Propelled Artillery Regiment	Lieutenant Colonel	22 August 1944	—
Ivan Vasilyev; Russian: Иван Васильевич Васильев	13th Light Tank Brigade	Red Army Man	21 March 1940	—
Ivan Dmitrievich Vasilyev; Russian: Иван Дмитриевич Васильев	19th Tank Corps	Lieutenant General	3 November 1943	—
Ivan Nikolaevich Vasilyev; Russian: Иван Николаевич Васильев	184th Guards Infantry Regiment	Red Army Guard	22 February 1944	—
Ivan Petrovich Vasilyev; Russian: Иван Петрович Васильев	9th Separate Motorized Pontoon-Bridge Battalion	Sergeant	17 October 1943	—
Illarion Vasilyev; Russian: Илларион Романович Васильев	1075th Infantry Regiment	Red Army Man	21 July 1942	—
Leonid Vasilyev; Russian: Леонид Иокинфович Васильев	1289th Self-Propelled Artillery Regiment Mechanized Corps	Captain	24 March 1945	—
Mikhail Ivanovich Vasilyev; Russian: Михаил Иванович Васильев	46th Tank Regiment	Senior Lieutenant	24 March 1945 †	Killed in action on 24 August 1944
Mikhail Nikolaevich Vasilyev; Russian: Михаил Николаевич Васильев	108th Separate Anti-Tank Fighter Division	Captain	16 October 1943	—
Mikhail Pavlovich Vasilyev; Russian: Михаил Павлович Васильев	75th Guards Assault Aviation Regiment	Guard Lieutenant	29 June 1945	—
Mikhail Pavlovich Vasilyev; Russian: Михаил Павлович Васильев	148th Guards Artillery-Mortar Regiment	Guard Starshina	31 May 1945	—
Mikhail Yakovlevich Vasilyev; Russian: Михаил Яковлевич Васильев	4th Guards Fighter Aviation Regiment	Guard Senior Lieutenant	14 June 1942	—
Nikandr Vasilyev; Russian: Никандр Васильевич Васильев	696th Infantry Regiment	Staff Sergeant	16 May 1944	—
Nikolai Alekseevich Vasilyev; Russian: Николай Алексеевич Васильев	24th Guards Infantry Corps	Guard Major-General	26 October 1943	—
Nikolai Grigorievich Vasilyev; Russian: Николай Григорьевич Васильев	2nd Special Guerrilla Brigade	Lieutenant Colonel	2 April 1944	—
Nikolai Konstantinovich Vasilyev; Russian: Николай Константинович Васильев	594th Assault Aviation Regiment	Captain	15 May 1946	—
Nikolai Nikolaevich Vasilyev; Russian: Николай Николаевич Васильев	107th Infantry Regiment	Junior Sergeant	15 January 1944	—
Nikolai Fyodorovich Vasilyev; Russian: Николай Фёдорович Васильев	528th Infantry Regiment	Junior Sergeant	25 September 1944	—
Pavel Yefimovich Vasilyev; Russian: Павел Ефимович Васильев	21st Motorized Engineer-Sapper Brigade	Captain	8 September 1945	—
Pavel Osipovich Vasilyev; Russian: Павел Осипович Васильев	3rd Heavy Howitzer Artillery Brigade	Senior Lieutenant	21 July 1944	—
Pavel Fyodorovich Vasilyev; Russian: Павел Фёдорович Васильев	17th Guards Infantry Division	Guard Colonel	8 September 1945 †	Killed in action on 15 August 1945
Sergey Nikolaevich Vasilyev; Russian: Сергей Николаевич Васильев	154th Naval Infantry Brigade	Midshipman	21 July 1942 †	Killed in action on 23 February 1942
Sergey Pavlovich Vasilyev; Russian: Сергей Павлович Васильев	2nd Battery of an Anti-Tank Fighter Artillery Regiment	Sergeant	28 April 1945 †	Killed in action in Spring 1944
Timofey Vasilyev; Russian: Тимофей Петрович Васильев	311th Infantry Regiment	Junior Sergeant	24 March 1945	—
Fyodor Andreevich Vasilyev; Russian: Фёдор Андреевич Васильев	1318th Infantry Regiment	Junior Lieutenant	29 October 1943	—
Fyodor Vasilyevich Vasilyev; Russian: Фёдор Васильевич Васильев	1085th Infantry Regiment	Red Army Man	16 October 1943 †	Killed in action on 30 August 1943
Feofan Vasilyev; Russian: Феофан Ильич Васильев	91st Separate Engineer Battalion	Staff Sergeant	3 June 1944	—
Boris Vasilyev-Kytin; Russian: Борис Сергеевич Васильев-Кытин	105th Guards Infantry Regiment	Guard Lieutenant	13 September 1944	—
Ivan Vasilkov; Russian: Иван Васильевич Васильков	79th Infantry Corps	Colonel	31 May 1945	—
Nikolai Vasilchenko; Russian: Николай Тихонович Васильченко	44th Guards Cannon-Artillery Brigade	Guard Sergeant	31 May 1945	—
Vladimir Vasilchinkov; Russian: Владимир Владимирович Васильчиков	33rd Guards Assault Aviation Regiment	Guard Staff Sergeant	1 May 1943 †	Killed in action on 14 March 1943
Aleksandr Vasilchuk; Russian: Александр Дмитриевич Васильчук	75th Guards Assault Aviation Regiment	Guard Junior Lieutenant	29 June 1945	—
Aleksandr Vasin; Russian: Александр Григорьевич Васин	177th Guards Infantry Regiment	Guard Lieutenant	15 May 1946 †	Killed in action on 18 April 1945
Vasily Vasin; Russian: Василий Иванович Васин	21st Infantry Regiment	Senior Lieutenant	29 October 1943	—
Ilya Vasin; Russian: Илья Иванович Васин	Separate Submachine Infantry Training Company	Sergeant	19 March 1944	—
Nikolai Vasin; Russian: Николай Алексеевич Васин	62nd Assault Aviation Regiment	Lieutenant	18 August 1945 †	Killed in action on 15 October 1944
Frol Vaskin; Russian: Фрол Васильевич Васькин	Separate Anti-aircraft Company of the 75th Guards Infantry Division	Guard Senior Lieutenant	31 May 1945	—
Aleksandr Vasko; Russian: Александр Фёдорович Васько	176th Guards Fighter Aviation Regiment	Guard Lieutenant	15 May 1946	—
Ilya Vasyuk; Russian: Илья Акимович Васюк	21st Infantry Regiment	Senior Lieutenant	13 September 1944	—
Sergey Vasyuta; Russian: Сергей Трофимович Васюта	9th Guards Mechanized Brigade	Guard Junior Sergeant	3 June 1944 †	Killed in action on 8 September 1943
Grigory Vasyanin; Russian: Григорий Фёдорович Васянин	337th Separate Sapper Battalion	Red Army Man	24 March 1945	—
Aleksandr Vatagin; Russian: Александр Иванович Ватагин	Deep-sea researcher	Captain 3rd Class	24 January 1991	—
Aleksey Vatagin; Russian: Алексей Михайлович Ватагин	355th Infantry Regiment	Senior Lieutenant	21 March 1940	—
Yakov Vatomov; Russian: Яков Иосифович Ватомов	212th Airborne Brigade	Sergeant	20 November 1941	—
Viktor Vakharlovsky; Russian: Виктор Валерианович Вахарловский	107th Separate Pontoon-Bridge Battalion	Staff Sergeant	24 March 1945	—
Aleksandr Vakhlaev; Russian: Александр Алексеевич Вахлаев	728th Fighter Aviation Regiment	Captain	1 July 1944	—
Aleksey Vakhnenko; Russian: Алексей Яковлевич Вахненко	617th Infantry Regiment	Senior Lieutenant	24 March 1945	—
Gennady Vakholkov; Russian: Геннадий Иванович Вахолков	40th Infantry Regiment	Lieutenant Colonel	24 March 1945	—
Grigory Vakhonin; Russian: Григорий Иванович Вахонин	417th Separate Reconnaissance Company	Staff Sergeant	15 January 1944	—
Mikhail Vakhrameev; Russian: Михаил Фёдорович Вахрамеев	492nd Anti-Tank Fighter Artillery Regiment	Lieutenant	1 November 1943	—
Aleksandr Vashkevich; Russian: Александр Александрович Вашкевич	739th Infantry Regiment	Lieutenant Colonel	26 October 1943	—
Gennady Vashlyaev; Russian: Геннадий Васильевич Вашляев	361st Separate Cannon-Artillery Battalion	Lieutenant	24 March 1945	—
Vladimir Vdovenko; Russian: Владимир Кириллович Вдовенко	1248th Anti-Tank Fighter Artillery Regiment	Sergeant	10 April 1945	—
Ivan Vdovenko; Russian: Иван Тимофеевич Вдовенко	81st Long-Range Bomber Aviation Regiment	Junior Lieutenant	20 June 1942 †	Killed in action on 28 August 1941
Mikhail Vdovenko; Russian: Михаил Николаевич Вдовенко	23rd Guards Motorized Infantry Brigade	Guard Starshina	17 November 1943	—
Ivan Vdovytchenko; Russian: Иван Григорьевич Вдовытченко	764th Infantry Regiment	Red Army Man	10 January 1944 †	Killed in action on 13 August 1943
Valentin Vedeneyev; Russian: Валентин Иванович Веденеев	159th Fighter Aviation Regiment	Senior Lieutenant	23 February 1945	—
Nikolai Vedeneyev; Russian: Николай Денисович Веденеев	9th Guards Tank Corps	Guard Major-General	6 April 1945	—
Viktor Vedenko; Russian: Виктор Антонович Веденко	334th Infantry Regiment	Lieutenant	22 July 1944 †	Killed in action on 26 June 1944
Valery Vedenkov; Russian: Валерий Леонидович Веденьков	1st Guards Separate Sapper Battalion	Guard Lieutenant	20 December 1943	—
Ivan Vedernikov; Russian: Иван Анисимович Ведерников	219th Tank Brigade	Junior Lieutenant	20 December 1943	—
Nikolai Vedernikov; Russian: Николай Степанович Ведерников	969th Infantry Regiment	Staff Sergeant	27 June 1945	—
Ivan Vedmedenko; Russian: Иван Иванович Ведмеденко	18th Guards Howitzer Artillery Brigade	Guard Captain	21 July 1944	—
Ivan Vezhlivtsev; Russian: Иван Дмитриевич Вежливцев	Separate Reconnaissance Company of the 1st Infantry Division	Starshina	6 February 1942	—
Aslan Vazirov; Azerbaijani: Aslan Vəzirov	1st Guards Assault Engineer-Sapper Brigade	Guard Colonel	29 June 1945	—
Pyotr Veligin; Russian: Пётр Владимирович Велигин	3rd Guards Motorized Battalion	Red Army Guard	16 May 1944 †	Captured and tortured to death on 13 April 1944
Mirza Valiyev; Russian: Мирза Давлетович Велиев	309th Guards Infantry Regiment	Guard Staff Sergeant	24 March 1945 †	Killed in action on 6 November 1944
Viktor Veliky; Russian: Великий Виктор Иванович	3rd Armoured Vessel Division of the Azov Flotilla	Senior Lieutenant	22 January 1944	—
Konstantin Veliky; Russian: Константин Трофимович Великий	178th Guards Infantry Regiment	Red Army Guard	19 March 1944	—
Grigory Velikokon; Russian: Григорий Иванович Великоконь	422nd Infantry Regiment	Staff Sergeant	24 March 1945	—
Ivan Velikorodny; Russian: Иван Николаевич Великородный	396th Separate Special-Purpose Aviation Regiment	Starshina	23 February 1945	—
Grigory Velisov; Russian: Григорий Никитович Велисов	60th Guards Cavalry Regiment	Guard Starshina	31 May 1945 †	Killed in action on 16 February 1945
Mikhail Velichay; Russian: Михаил Лукич Величай	100th Guards Infantry Regiment	Guard Major	22 February 1944 †	Killed in action on 30 September 1943
Valery Velichko; Russian: Валерий Фёдорович Величко	117th Tank Brigade	Staff Sergeant	24 March 1945 †	Killed in action on 18 September 1944
Vladimir Velichko; Russian: Владимир Сидорович Величко	722nd Infantry Regiment	Senior Lieutenant	3 June 1944	—
Gennady Velichko; Russian: Геннадий Иосифович Величко	1008th Infantry Regiment	Staff Sergeant	26 October 1943	—
Vladimir Ventsov; Russian: Владимир Кириллович Венцов; German: Waldemar Wentzel	1185th Infantry Regiment	Lieutenant	15 January 1944 †	Killed in action on 25 September 1943
Nikolai Verbin; Russian: Николай Николаевич Вербин	288th Guards Infantry Regiment	Guard Senior Lieutenant	27 February 1945	—
Aleksandr Verbitsky; Russian: Александр Евлампиевич Вербицкий	27th Guards Bomber Aviation Regiment	Guard Captain	15 May 1946	—
Mikhail Verbitsky; Russian: Михаил Константинович Вербицкий	118th Separate Reconnaissance Aviation Regiment	Captain	22 January 1944	—
Timofey Verbitsky; Russian: Тимофей Сергеевич Вербицкий	759th Infantry Regiment	Staff Sergeant	10 January 1944	—
Ivan Verbovsky; Russian: Иван Устинович Вербовский	26th Guards Airborne Regiment	Guard Staff Sergeant	27 June 1945	—
Yakov Vergun; Russian: Яков Пантелеймонович Вергун	181st Tank Brigade	Captain	22 February 1944	—
Avaz Verdiyev; Azerbaijani: Əvəz Həşim oğlu Verdiyev	55th Guards Tank Brigade	Guard Staff Sergeant	23 September 1944	—
Vasily Veryovkin; Russian: Василий Трофимович Верёвкин	155th Guards Assault Aviation Regiment	Guard Captain	26 October 1944	—
Ivan Veremey; Russian: Иван Николаевич Веремей	83rd Guards Self-Propelled Artillery Regiment	Guard Lieutenant Colonel	10 April 1945	—
Viktor Vereskov; Russian: Виктор Александрович Вересков	52nd Guards Tank Brigade	Guard Junior Sergeant	10 January 1944	—
Viktor Veresov; Russian: Виктор Иванович Вересов	5th Marine Corps Brigade	Sergeant	21 February 1944 †	Killed in action on 10 December 1941
Pyotr Veretennikov; Russian: Пётр Митрофанович Веретенников	933rd Infantry Regiment	Senior Lieutenant	22 February 1944	—
Boris Verizhnikov; Russian: Борис Сергеевич Верижников	76th Guards Infantry Regiment	Guard Captain	24 March 1945	—
Pyotr Vernigora; Russian: Пётр Леонтьевич Вернигора	1817th Self-propelled Artillery Regiment	Lieutenant	22 February 1944 †	Killed in action on 20 November 1943
Ivan Vernigorenko; Russian: Иван Григорьевич Вернигоренко	78th Guards Infantry Regiment	Guard Staff Sergeant	18 May 1943	—
Pyotr Vernidub; Russian: Пётр Данилович Вернидуб	270th Separate Anti-Tank Fighter Division	Lieutenant	24 March 1945	—
Yakov Vernikov; Russian: Яков Ильич Верников	147th Guards Fighter Aviation Regiment	Guard Captain	18 November 1944	—
Anatoly Vernyaev; Russian: Анатолий Яковлевич Верняев	4th Guards Long-Range Aviation Regiment	Guard Senior Lieutenant	13 March 1944	—
Pyotr Verteletsky; Russian: Пётр Михайлович Вертелецкий	140th Guards Infantry Regiment	Guard Sergeant	24 March 1945 †	Killed in action on 3 February 1945
Kirill Vertyakov; Russian: Кирилл Романович Вертяков	310th Infantry Regiment	Junior Sergeant	16 October 1943	—
Valery Verkholantsev; Russian: Валерий Александрович Верхоланцев	98th Separate Corrective-Reconnaissance Aviation Regiment	Major	15 May 1946	—
Gennady Verkhoshansky; Russian: Геннадий Дмитриевич Верхошанский	79th Guards Separate Reconnaissance Company	Guard Junior Lieutenant	26 October 1943	—
Konstantin Vershinin; Russian: Константин Андреевич Вершинин	4th Air Army	Colonel-General of Aviation	19 August 1944	—
Fyodor Vershinin; Russian: Фёдор Григорьевич Вершинин	Ship "Щ-311" of the Baltic Fleet	Lieutenant Captain	7 February 1940	—
Aleksandr Veselov; Russian: Александр Михайлович Веселов	331st Infantry Regiment	Red Army Man	21 March 1940	—
Vasily Veselov; Russian: Василий Иванович Веселов	28th Guards Separate Sapper Battalion	Guard Sergeant	19 March 1944 †	Killed in action on 26 September 1943
Mikhail Veselov; Russian: Михаил Алексеевич Веселов	1232nd Infantry Regiment	Lieutenant	24 March 1945	—
Nikolai Vesnin; Russian: Николай Дмитриевич Веснин	938th Infantry Regiment	Sergeant	22 July 1944 †	Killed in action on 24 June 1944
Georgy Vetoshnikov; Russian: Георгий Александрович Ветошников	100th Separate Motorized Pontoon-Bridge Battalion	Junior Lieutenant	19 March 1944	—
Viktor Vetrov; Russian: Виктор Митрофанович Ветров	136th Guards Assault Aviation Regiment	Guard Senior Lieutenant	19 April 1945	—
Grigory Vetchinkin; Russian: Григорий Петрович Ветчинкин	1330th Anti-Tank Fighter Artillery Regiment	Corporal	29 March 1944	—
Kuzma Vetchinkin; Russian: Кузьма Фёдорович Ветчинкин	25th Cahul Frontier Detachment of the Moldovan Frontier District	Lieutenant	26 August 1941	—
Grigory Vekhin; Russian: Григорий Иванович Вехин	350th Infantry Division	Major-General	29 May 1945	—
Ivan Vekhov; Russian: Иван Иосифович Вехов	1037th Artillery Regiment	Sergeant	24 March 1945	—
Ivan Vechtomov; Russian: Иван Дмитриевич Вечтомов	1131st Infantry Regiment	Senior Lieutenant	24 March 1945 †	Killed in action on 3 October 1944
Pyotr Veshchev; Russian: Пётр Евгеньевич Вещев	24th Infantry Division	Brigade Commander	15 January 1940 †	Killed in action on 6 December 1939
Nikolai Vidulin; Russian: Николай Гаврилович Видулин	438th Infantry Regiment	Lieutenant	27 August 1943	—
Nikolai Vidyashev; Russian: Николай Тимофеевич Видяшев	57th Infantry Regiment	Captain	21 March 1940 †	Killed in action on 11 March 1940
Ivan Vizgalin; Russian: Иван Павлович Визгалин	78th Guards Infantry Regiment	Red Army Guard	18 May 1943 †	Killed in action on 5 March 1943
Vladimir Viktorenko; Russian: Владимир Иосифович Викторенко	1137th Light Artillery Regiment	Junior Lieutenant	31 May 1945 †	Killed in action on 6 February 1945
Vasily Viktorov; Russian: Василий Филиппович Викторов	9th Guards Separate Sapper Battalion	Guard Senior Lieutenant	31 May 1945	—
Grigory Viktorov; Russian: Григорий Петрович Викторов	74th Guards Assault Aviation Regiment	Guard Senior Lieutenant	19 April 1945	—
Konstantin Viktorov; Russian: Константин Николаевич Викторов	99th Separate Reconnaissance Company	Senior Lieutenant	29 June 1945	—
Pavel Vikulov; Russian: Павел Иванович Викулов	50th Guards Tank Brigade	Guard Junior Lieutenant	27 February 1945 †	Killed in action on 23 January 1945
Volfas Vilenskis; Hebrew: וולף וילנסקי	249th Infantry Regiment	Major	24 March 1945	—
Nikolai Vilkov; Russian: Николай Александрович Вилков	Petropavlovsk naval base of the Northern Fleet	Starshina 1st Class	14 September 1945 †	Killed in action on 18 August 1945
Yanis Vilkhelms; Russian: Янис Вилхелмс; Latvian: Vilhelms Jānis	92nd Infantry Regiment	Junior Lieutenant	21 July 1942	—
Aleksey Vildimanov; Russian: Алексей Владимирович Вильдиманов	597th Artillery Regiment	Red Army Man	24 March 1945	—
Veniamin Vilsky; Russian: Вениамин Владимирович Вильский	17th Guards Mechanized Brigade	Guard Corporal	10 April 1945	—
Semyon Vilkhovsky; Russian: Семён Михайлович Вильховский	85th Guards Infantry Regiment	Guard Lieutenant Colonel	22 February 1944	—
Aleksandr Vilyamson; Russian: Александр Александрович Вильямсон	104th Guards Fighter Aviation Regiment	Guard Captain	27 June 1945	—
Vasily Vinevitin; Russian: Василий Михайлович Виневитин	Engineering service of Posyet border detachment of the Far Eastern Frontier District	Lieutenant	25 October 1938 †	Killed by a Soviet passage guard on 1 August 1938
Leonid Viner; Russian: Леонид Леонидович Винер	34th Guards Separate Tank Brigade	Guard Staff Sergeant	22 July 1944 †	Killed in action on 22 July 1944
Pyotr Vinichenko; Russian: Пётр Дмитриевич Виниченко	858th Infantry Regiment	Senior Lieutenant	3 June 1944 †	Killed in action on 25 November 1943
Pyotr Vinnik; Russian: Пётр Фёдорович Винник	509th Infantry Regiment	Starshina	22 February 1944	—
Yuri Vinnik; Russian: Юрий Михайлович Винник	973rd Artillery Regiment	Captain	26 October 1944	—
Nikolai Vinnikov; Russian: Николай Иванович Винников	40th Guards Mortar Regiment	Guard Senior Lieutenant	18 November 1944 †	Killed in action on 20 June 1944
Aleksandr Gennadievich Vinogradov; Russian: Александр Геннадьевич Виноградов	36th Tank Brigade	Senior Lieutenant	31 May 1945	—
Aleksandr Dmitrievich Vinogradov; Russian: Александр Дмитриевич Виноградов	1st Guards Infantry Regiment	Guard Senior Lieutenant	25 October 1943	—
Aleksey Vinogradov; Russian: Алексей Дмитриевич Виноградов	60th Guards Tank Brigade	Guard Lieutenant	26 September 1944 †	Killed in action on 23 July 1944
Andrey Vinogradov; Russian: Андрей Степанович Виноградов	245th Infantry Regiment	Junior Commander	21 March 1940	—
Vyacheslav Vinogradov; Russian: Вячеслав Тимофеевич Виноградов	K-116 Submarine	Guard Captain 2nd Class	23 May 1966	—
Gennady Vinogradov; Russian: Геннадий Павлович Виноградов	12th Guards Tank Brigade	Red Army Guard	17 April 1943	—
Grigory Vinogradov; Russian: Григорий Аркадьевич Виноградов	44th Guards Tank Brigade	Guard Junior Lieutenant	27 February 1945	—
Ivan Ivanovich Vinogradov; Russian: Иван Иванович Виноградов	62nd Guards Separate Motorized Sniper Battalion	Guard Sergeant	3 June 1944	—
Ivan Kuzmich Vinogradov; Russian: Иван Кузьмич Виноградов	184th Guards Infantry Regiment	Guard Starshina	22 February 1944 †	Died of wounds on 10 October 1943
Ivan Nikiforovich Vinogradov; Russian: Иван Никифорович Виноградов	235th Assault Aviation Regiment	Captain	4 February 1944	—
Leonid Vinogradov; Russian: Леонид Васильевич Виноградов	85th Aviation Regiment	Captain	7 April 1940	—
Mikhail Vinogradov; Russian: Михаил Николаевич Виноградов	201st Guards Infantry Regiment	Guard Staff Sergeant	24 March 1945 †	Killed in action on 3 July 1944
Nikolai Vinogradov; Russian: Николай Константинович Виноградов	241th Guards Infantry Regiment	Guard Staff Sergeant	17 October 1943	—
Pyotr Vinogradov; Russian: Пётр Ильич Виноградов	412th Infantry Regiment	Junior Sergeant	24 March 1945	—
Yakov Vinogradov; Russian: Яков Савельевич Виноградов	520th Infantry Regiment	Junior Lieutenant	13 November 1943	—
Boris Vinokurov; Russian: Борис Алексеевич Винокуров	398th Separate Tank Battalion	Red Army Man	7 April 1940 †	Killed in action on 11 February 1940
Vasily Vinokurov; Russian: Василий Иосифович Винокуров	91st Tank Brigade	Starshina	27 June 1945	—
Vyacheslav Vinokurov; Russian: Вячеслав Петрович Винокуров	303th Separate Tank Battalion	Lieutenant	25 October 1938	—
Maksim Vinokurov; Russian: Максим Ильич Винокуров	7th Guards Airborne Regiment	Guard Senior Lieutenant	17 October 1943 †	Killed in action on 7 October 1943
Fyodor Vinokurov; Russian: Фёдор Иванович Винокуров	17th Infantry Regiment	Lieutenant Colonel	27 February 1945	—
Movlid Visaitov; Russian: Мавлид Алероевич Висаитов	28th Guards Cavalry Regiment	Guard Lieutenant Colonel	5 May 1990	—
Fyodor Vislevsky; Russian: Фёдор Павлович Вислевский	384th Artillery Regiment	Senior Lieutenant	30 October 1943	—
Konstantin Visovin; Russian: Константин Гаврилович Висовин	70th Guards Infantry Regiment	Red Army Guard	24 March 1945 †	Killed in action on 9 May 1944
Aleksandr Visyashchev; Russian: Александр Иванович Висящев	1266th Infantry Regiment	Red Army Man	24 March 1945	—
Valentin Vitvinsky; Russian: Валентин Фёдорович Витвинский	202nd Guards Infantry Regiment	Guard Staff Sergeant	13 November 1943	—
Vladimir Vitin; Russian: Владимир Карпович Витин	2nd Tank Brigade	Comissar	5 May 1942 †	Killed in action on 8 February 1942
Ivan Vitkovsky; Russian: Иван Петрович Витковский	66th Guards Fighter Aviation Regiment	Guard Major	23 February 1945	—
Andrey Vitruk; Russian: Андрей Никифорович Витрук	5th Assault Aviation Regiment	Lieutenant Colonel	24 February 1942	—
Aleksey Vikharev; Russian: Алексей Васильевич Вихарев	890th Long-Range Aviation Regiment	Major	18 September 1943	—
Zalman Vikhin; Russian: Залман Давидович Вихнин	288th Infantry Regiment	Captain	16 October 1943 †	Killed in action on 26 September 1943
Vasily Vikhorev; Russian: Василий Александрович Вихорев	4th Motorized Pontoon-Bridge Regiment	Major	24 March 1945 †	Killed in action on 26 June 1944
Pyotr Vikhrev; Russian: Пётр Борисович Вихрев	1075th Infantry Regiment	Comissar	31 March 1943 †	Killed in action on 16 November 1941
Ivan Vikhrov; Russian: Иван Григорьевич Вихров	1030th Artillery Regiment	Staff Sergeant	29 June 1945	—
Vladimir Vishenkov; Russian: Владимир Михайлович Вишенков	8th Separate Distance Reconnaissance Aviation Regiment	Senior Lieutenant	13 April 1944	—
Vladimir Vishnevetsky; Russian: Владимир Михайлович Вишневецкий	60th Guards Cavalry Regiment	Guard Staff Sergeant	9 February 1944	—
Konstantin Vishnevetsky; Russian: Константин Григорьевич Вишневецкий	298th Fighter Aviation Regiment	Senior Lieutenant	24 August 1943	—
Anatoly Vishnevsky; Russian: Анатолий Петрович Вишневский	307th Guards Infantry Regiment	Guard Junior Lieutenant	28 April 1945 †	Killed in action on 28 November 1944
Boris Vishnevsky; Russian: Борис Степанович Вишневский	57th Separate Fighter-Sniper Battalion	Red Army Man	20 April 1945 †	Killed in action on 27 March 1944
Mikhail Vishnevsky; Russian: Михаил Григорьевич Вишневский	292nd Guards Infantry Regiment	Guard Major	27 June 1945 †	Killed in action on 24 February 1945
Ivan Vishnyakov; Russian: Иван Алексеевич Вишняков	171st Fighter Aviation Regiment	Major	23 February 1948	—
Aleksandr Vladimirov; Russian: Александр Иванович Владимиров	1281th Infantry Regiment	Junior Sergeant	30 October 1943	—
Boris Vladimirov; Russian: Борис Александрович Владимиров	311th Infantry Division	Major-General	6 April 1945	—
Vladimir Fedorovich Vladimirov; Russian: Владимир Фёдорович Владимиров	118th Guards Infantry Regiment	Guard Lieutenant	15 January 1944	—
Mikhail Grigorievich Vladimirov; Russian: Михаил Григорьевич Владимиров	108th Long-Range Aviation Regiment	Captain	5 November 1944	—
Mikhail Nikolaevich Vladimirov; Russian: Михаил Николаевич Владимиров	958th Self-propelled Artillery Regiment	Junior Lieutenant	24 March 1945	—
Vasily Vladysev; Russian: Василий Георгиевич Владысев	113th Infantry Regiment	Junior Lieutenant	19 April 1945 †	Died of wounds on 31 January 1945
Aleksey Vlaznev; Russian: Алексей Леонтьевич Влазнев	9th Guards Mechanized Brigade	Red Army Guard	3 June 1944	—
Aleksey Vlasenko; Russian: Алексей Исидорович Власенко	149th Guards Infantry Regiment	Guard Senior Lieutenant	1 November 1943 †	Killed in action on 19 October 1943
Ivan Vlasenko; Russian: Иван Афанасьевич Власенко	137th Guards Infantry Regiment	Guard Lieutenant Colonel	24 March 1945	—
Ilya Vlasenko; Russian: Илья Архипович Власенко	75th Guards Infantry Division	Guard Colonel	17 October 1943	—
Nikolai Vlasenko; Russian: Николай Поликарпович Власенко	271th Motorized Infantry Regiment	Comissar	7 April 1940	—
Pyotr Vlasenko; Russian: Пётр Андреевич Власенко	465th Infantry Regiment	Red Army Man	13 November 1943	—
Sergey Vlasenko; Russian: Сергей Платонович Власенко	280th Guards Anti-Tank Fighter Artillery Regiment	Guard Staff Sergeant	22 August 1944	—
Pyotr Vlasenkov; Russian: Пётр Матвеевич Власенков	520th Infantry Regiment	Lieutenant	10 January 1944	—
Aleksey Alekseevich Vlasov; Russian: Алексей Алексеевич Власов	122nd Guards Artillery Regiment	Guard Starshina	21 September 1943 †	Killed in action on 7 July 1943
Aleksey Vasilyevich Vlasov; Russian: Алексей Васильевич Власов	25th Guards Infantry Regiment	Red Army Guard	15 January 1944	—
Andrey Vlasov; Russian: Андрей Яковлевич Власов	40th Guards Tank Brigade	Guard Captain	31 May 1945	—
Vasily Vlasov; Russian: Василий Евдокимович Власов	108th Tank Brigade	Starshina	24 March 1945	—
Ivan Vlasov; Russian: Иван Павлович Власов	50th High-speed Bomber Aviation Regiment	Captain	21 March 1940	—
Mitrofan Vlasov; Russian: Митрофан Ефимович Власов	86th Infantry Regiment	Lieutenant	29 October 1943	—
Mikhail Konstantinovich Vlasov; Russian: Михаил Константинович Власов	370th Separate Anti-Tank Fighter Division	Captain	21 July 1944 †	Killed in action on 26 June 1944
Mikhail Maksimovich Vlasov; Russian: Михаил Максимович Власов	218th Guards Infantry Regiment	Red Army Guard	15 January 1944	—
Mikhail Markovich Vlasov; Russian: Михаил Маркович Власов	106th Infantry Division	Colonel	30 October 1943	—
Nikolai Dmitrievich Vlasov; Russian: Николай Дмитриевич Власов	170th Separate Fighter-Sniper Battalion	Red Army Man	30 October 1943	—
Nikolai Ivanovich Vlasov; Russian: Николай Иванович Власов	275th Fighter Aviation Division	Lieutenant Colonel	23 November 1942	Burned alive on 26 January 1945 for organizing a prisoner uprising at the Mauthausen-Gusen concentration camp
Pyotr Vlasov; Russian: Пётр Дмитриевич Власов	814th Infantry Regiment	Senior Lieutenant	1 November 1943 †	Killed in action on 29 September 1943
Yakov Vlasyukov; Russian: Яков Анисимович Власюков	842nd Infantry Regiment	Red Army Man	10 January 1944	—
Mikhail Vnukov; Russian: Михаил Николаевич Внуков	1318th Infantry Regiment	Red Army Man	29 October 1943	—
Mikhail Vovk; Russian: Михаил Павлович Вовк	1st Guards Cannon Artillery Brigade	Guard Senior Lieutenant	17 October 1943	—
Pyotr Vovna; Russian: Пётр Алексеевич Вовна	2nd High-speed Bomber Aviation Regiment	Captain	7 April 1940 †	Killed in action on 2 March 1940
Nikolai Vovchenko; Russian: Николай Дмитриевич Вовченко	283rd Guards Infantry Regiment	Guard Senior Lieutenant	27 February 1945	—
Nikolai Vodolazkin; Russian: Николай Степанович Водолазкин	22nd Guards Separate Tank Regiment	Guard Staff Sergeant	24 March 1945	—
Andrey Vodyanikov; Russian: Андрей Васильевич Водяников	252nd Separate Motorized Battalion	Junior Lieutenant	20 December 1943 †	Killed in action on 1 October 1943
Dmitry Voevodin; Russian: Дмитрий Тимофеевич Воеводин	167th Infantry Division	Red Army Man	10 January 1944	—
Leonid Voevodin; Russian: Леонид Михайлович Воеводин	185th Artillery Regiment	Captain	17 November 1939	—
Georgy Vozhakin; Russian: Георгий Михайлович Вожакин	447th Infantry Regiment	Senior Lieutenant	31 May 1945	—
Nikolai Vozdvizhensky; Russian: Николай Николаевич Воздвиженский	62nd Assault Aviation Regiment	Senior Lieutenant	23 February 1945	—
Aleksandr Vozlikov; Russian: Александр Филиппович Возликов	52nd Guards Separate Reconnaissance Company	Guard Sergeant	22 July 1944 †	Killed in action on 25 June 1944
Fyodor Voznesensky; Russian: Фёдор Сергеевич Вознесенский	201st Guards Infantry Regiment	Guard Sergeant	24 March 1945 †	Killed in action on 3 July 1944
Ivan Voinov; Russian: Иван Ефимович Воинов	269th Separate Fighter Battalion	Red Army Man	19 March 1944	—
Mikhail Voinov; Russian: Михаил Львович Воинов	384th Artillery Regiment	Corporal	30 October 1943	—
Yefim Voinshin; Russian: Ефим Андреевич Воиншин	616th Artillery Regiment	Staff Sergeant	24 March 1945	—
Anatoly Voytekaytes; Russian: Анатолий Николаевич Войтекайтес	166th Guards Assault Aviation Regiment	Guard Major	29 June 1945	—
Ivan Voytenko; Russian: Иван Фёдорович Войтенко	116th Guards Artillery Regiment	Guard Lieutenant	31 March 1943	—
Stefan Voytenko; Russian: Стефан Ефимович Войтенко	6th Guards Fighter Aviation Regiment	Guard Major	5 November 1944	—
Vasily Volgin; Russian: Василий Леонтьевич Волгин	78th Guards Assault Aviation Regiment	Guard Captain	13 April 1944	—
Ivan Volgin; Russian: Иван Тимофеевич Волгин	985th Infantry Regiment	Sergeant	17 October 1943	—
Mikhail Volik; Russian: Михаил Александрович Волик	340th Guards Infantry Regiment	Guard Lieutenant	10 April 1945	—
Semyon Volikov; Russian: Семён Антонович Воликов	203rd Guards Howitzer Artillery Regiment	Red Army Guard	24 December 1943	—
Boris Volk; Russian: Борис Васильевич Волк	20th Tank Brigade	Junior Commander	15 January 1940 †	Killed in action on 13 December 1931
Sergey Volkenshteyn; Russian: Сергей Сергеевич Волкенштейн	17th Artillery Division	Major-General	29 May 1945	—
Aleksandr Ivanovich Volkov; Russian: Александр Иванович Волков	131st Guards Infantry Regiment	Guard Junior Lieutenant	5 October 1944 †	Killed in action on 15 January 1944
Aleksandr Ivanovich Volkov; Russian: Александр Иванович Волков	117th Tank Brigade	Lieutenant	24 March 1945 †	Killed in action on 19 September 1944
Aleksandr Mikhailovich Volkov; Russian: Александр Михайлович Волков	359th Infantry Regiment	Red Army Man	10 April 1945	—
Aleksandr Pavlovich Volkov; Russian: Александр Павлович Волков	26th Guards Tank Brigade	Guard Lieutenant	24 March 1945	—
Andrey Volkov; Russian: Андрей Алексеевич Волков	104th Tank Regiment	Lieutenant	24 March 1945	—
Vasily Aleksandrovich Volkov; Russian: Василий Александрович Волков	283rd Guards Rifle Regiment	Guard Sergeant	27 February 1945	—
Vasily Stepanovich Volkov; Russian: Василий Степанович Волков	171st anti-tank artillery regiment	Captain	29 June 1945	—
Viktor Volkov; Russian: Виктор Фёдорович Волков	157th Fighter Aviation Regiment	Major	1 July 1944	—
Dmitry Volkov; Russian: Дмитрий Петрович Волков	3rd Long-Range Aviation Regiment	Captain	18 September 1943	—
Yevgeny Maksimovich Volkov; Russian: Евгений Максимович Волков	47th Guards Tank Brigade	Guard Senior Lieutenant	27 February 1945 †	Killed in action on 17 January 1945
Yevgeny Fyodorovich Volkov; Russian: Евгений Фёдорович Волков	219th Tank Brigade	Lieutenant	20 December 1943	—
Yevdokim Volkov; Russian: Евдоким Денисович Волков	685th Infantry Regiment	Senior Lieutenant	30 October 1943 †	Killed in action on 15 October 1943
Ivan Arkhipovich Volkov; Russian: Иван Архипович Волков	536th Infantry Regiment	Senior Lieutenant	22 February 1943 †	Killed in action on 14 April 1942
Ivan Stepanovich Volkov; Russian: Иван Степанович Волков	60th Guards Bomber Aviation Regiment	Guard Captain	1 July 1944	—
Lazar Volkov; Russian: Лазарь Григорьевич Волков	1318th Infantry Regiment	Red Army Man	10 January 1944	—
Mikhail Vasilyevich Volkov; Russian: Михаил Васильевич Волков	1031st Infantry Regiment	Red Army Man	17 October 1943 †	Killed in action on 4 October 1943
Mikhail Yevdokimovich Volkov; Russian: Михаил Евдокимович Волков	558th Infantry Regiment	Lieutenant Colonel	24 March 1945	—
Mikhail Yermolayevich Volkov; Russian: Михаил Ермолаевич Волков	665th Separate Sapper Battalion	Senior Lieutenant	24 March 1945	—
Mikhail Ivanovich Volkov; Russian: Михаил Иванович Волков	35th Guards Artillery Regiment	Guard Senior Lieutenant	24 March 1945	—
Mikhail Karpovich Volkov; Russian: Михаил Карпович Волков	100th Tank Brigade	Staff Sergeant	10 April 1945	—
Mikhail Prokofievich Volkov; Russian: Михаил Прокофьевич Волков	47th Infantry Regiment	Staff Sergeant	10 April 1945	—
Nikolai Vasilyevich Volkov; Russian: Николай Васильевич Волков	936th Infantry Regiment	Sergeant	22 February 1944 †	Killed in action on 17 November 1943
Nikolai Grigorievich Volkov; Russian: Николай Григорьевич Волков	7th Guards Mechanized Corps	Guard Lieutenant Colonel	17 October 1943	—
Nikolai Ivanovich Volkov; Russian: Николай Иванович Волков	175th Guards Infantry Regiment	Guard Sergeant	10 April 1945	—
Nikolai Nikolaevich Volkov; Russian: Николай Николаевич Волков	53rd Guards Tank Brigade	Guard Sergeant	10 April 1945	—
Nikolai Terentyevich Volkov; Russian: Николай Терентьевич Волков	32nd Guards Rifle Regiment	Guard Major	15 January 1944	—
Nikolai Fyodorovich Volkov; Russian: Николай Фёдорович Волков	1853rd Anti-tank Artillery Regiment	Captain	24 March 1945 †	Killed in action on 23 August 1944
Pavel Volkov; Russian: Павел Семёнович Волков	530th Army Fighter and Anti-tank; Artillery Regiment	Captain	27 June 1945 †	Killed in action on 30 April 1945
Pyotr Pavlovich Volkov; Russian: Пётр Павлович Волков	84th Guards Separate Anti-tank Fighter Battalion	Red Army Guard	7 August 1943 †	Killed in action on 6 July 1943
Pyotr Timofeevich Volkov; Russian: Пётр Тимофеевич Волков	1334th Anti-aircraft Artillery Regiment	Sergeant	9 February 1944 †	Killed in action on 3 November 1943
Semyon Volkov; Russian: Семён Михайлович Волков	366th Infantry Regiment	Senior Lieutenant	1 November 1943	—
Sergey Volkov; Russian: Сергей Петрович Волков	86th Heavy Howitzer Artillery Brigade	Captain	31 May 1945	—
Fyodor Volkov; Russian: Фёдор Андреевич Волков	91st Infantry Corps	Lieutenant General	6 April 1945	—
Filipp Volkov; Russian: Филипп Григорьевич Волков	50th Guards Cavalry Regiment	Red Army Guard	15 May 1946	—
Afanasy Volkovenko; Russian: Афанасий Иванович Волковенко	6th Guards Cavalry Regiment	Guard Senior Lieutenant	3 June 1944	—
Vladimir Volkovsky; Russian: Владимир Филиппович Волковский	66th Guards Tank Brigade	Guard Lieutenant	24 March 1945	—
Ivan Volkodav; Russian: Иван Егорович Волкодав	250th Guards Rifle Regiment	Guard Major	29 June 1945	—
Boris Volovodov; Russian: Борис Наумович Воловодов	47th Attack Aviation Regiment	Lieutenant	17 November 1943 †	Killed in action on 3 November 1943 while making an aerial ramming
Aleksandr Vologin; Russian: Александр Дмитриевич Вологин	118th Guards Rifle Regiment	Guard Junior Sergeant	15 January 1944	—
Aleksandr Volodin; Russian: Александр Фёдорович Володин	4th Guards Airborne Division	Guard Captain	13 September 1944 †	Killed in action on 13 March 1943
Anatoly Volodin; Russian: Анатолий Иванович Володин	164th Fighter Aviation Regiment	Captain	23 February 1948	—
Semyon Volodin; Russian: Семён Егорович Володин	143rd Guards Ground Attack Aviation Regiment	Guard Lieutenant Colonel	26 October 1944	—
Pyotr Volokitin; Russian: Пётр Григорьевич Волокитин	381st Guards Parachute Regiment	Senior Lieutenant	18 December 1956 †	—
Viktor Volosatov; Russian: Виктор Александрович Волосатов	609th Infantry Regiment	Sergeant	24 March 1945	—
Ivan Volosatov; Russian: Иван Кириллович Волосатов	114th Infantry Regiment	Captain	29 June 1945 †	Killed in action on 13 April 1945
Pavel Volosatykh; Russian: Павел Михайлович Волосатых	263rd Infantry Division	Colonel	16 May 1944	—
Ivan Volosevich; Russian: Иван Иванович Волосевич	13th Aviation Squadron of the Baltic Fleet	Commissar	21 April 1940	—
Pyotr Volosevich; Russian: Пётр Семёнович Волосевич	255th Infantry Regiment	Red Army Man	11 April 1940 †	Killed in action on 7 March 1940
Nikolai Volostnov; Russian: Николай Дмитриевич Волостнов	82nd Guards Rifle Regiment	Guard Sergeant	29 June 1945 †	—
Anatoly Volokh; Russian: Анатолий Александрович Волох	12th Separate Reconnaissance Battalion	Sergeant	17 November 1943	—
Aleksandr Volokhov; Russian: Александр Николаевич Волохов	1118th Infantry Regiment	Staff Sergeant	22 February 1944	—
Mikhail Voloshenko; Russian: Михаил Фёдорович Волошенко	838th Infantry Regiment	Sergeant	23 October 1943	—
Aleksandr Voloshin; Russian: Александр Иович Волошин	107th Guards Fighter Aviation Regiment	Guard Senior Lieutenant	27 June 1945	—
Aleksey Voloshin; Russian: Алексей Прохорович Волошин	271st Infantry Regiment	Senior Lieutenant	16 October 1943	—
Andrey Voloshin; Russian: Андрей Максимович Волошин	295th Guards Infantry Regiment	Guard Lieutenant Colonel	24 March 1945	—
Ivan Voloshin; Russian: Иван Андреевич Волошин	212th Guards Rifle Regiment	Red Army Guard	17 October 1943	—
Lavrenty Voloshin; Russian: Лаврентий Иванович Волошин	316th Infantry Division	Colonel	28 April 1945 †	Killed in action on 11 December 1944
Methody Voloshin; Russian: Мефодий Данилович Волошин	171st Guards Rifle Regiment	Red Army Guard	24 March 1945	—
Mikhail Voloshin; Russian: Михаил Евстафьевич Волошин	234th Infantry Regiment	Major	22 July 1944	—
Nikolai Voloshin; Russian: Николай Фёдорович Волошин	1297th Infantry Regiment	Staff Sergeant	24 March 1945	—
Grigory Voloshko; Russian: Григорий Семёнович Волошко	384th Separate Marine Battalion of the Black Sea Fleet	Lieutenant	20 April 1945 †	Killed in action on 27 March 1944
Konstantin Voloshchuk; Russian: Константин Никитович Волощук	177th Guards Rifle Regiment	Guard Captain	15 May 1946 †	Killed in action on 24 April 1945
Pavel Volchenko; Russian: Павел Кузьмич Волченко	157th Guards Artillery Regiment	Guard Lieutenant	31 May 1945	—
Ivan Volchkov; Russian: Иван Никитович Волчков	22nd Guards Infantry Regiment	Guard Captain	24 March 1945	Killed in action on 14 July 1944
Vasily Volynkin; Russian: Василий Дмитриевич Волынкин	129th Separate Infantry Brigade	Captain	31 March 1943 †	Killed in action on 10 August 1942
Ilya Volynkin; Russian: Илья Тихонович Волынкин	36th Mine-Torpedo Aviation Regiment	Captain	5 November 1944	—
Vasily Volyntsev; Russian: Василий Михайлович Волынцев	130th Guards Artillery Regiment	Guard Junior Sergeant	20 December 1943	—
Ivan Volvatenko; Russian: Иван Кириллович Вольватенко	56th Guards Tank Brigade	Guard Senior Lieutenant	10 January 1944	—
Viktor Volsky; Russian: Виктор Вацлавович Вольский	1354th Anti-Aircraft Artillery Regiment	Starshina	24 March 1945	—
Aleksandr Vorobiev; Russian: Александр Дмитриевич Воробьёв	11th Motorized Infantry Brigade	Red Army Man	23 October 1943	—
Aleksey Vorobyev; Russian: Алексей Иванович Воробьёв	22nd Guards Motorized Infantry Brigade	Guard Starshina	27 June 1945	—
Dmitry Vorobyov; Russian: Дмитрий Андреевич Воробьёв	59th Separate Engineer-Sapper Brigade	Captain	17 October 1943 †	Killed in action on 29 September 1943
Yegor Vorobyov; Russian: Егор Терентьевич Воробьёв	23rd Guards Airborne Regiment	Guard Junior Sergeant	27 June 1945	—
Ivan Alekseyevich Vorobyov; Russian: Иван Алексеевич Воробьёв	76th Guards Ground Attack Air Regiment	Guard Senior Lieutenant; Guard Major	19 August 1944; 29 June 1945	Twice Hero of the Soviet Union
Ivan Grigorievich Vorobyov; Russian: Иван Григорьевич Воробьёв	190th Assault Aviation Regiment	Captain	26 October 1944	—
Ivan Ivanovich Vorobyov; Russian: Иван Иванович Воробьёв	18th Guards Bomber Aviation Regiment	Guard Major	15 May 1946	—
Konsantin Vorobyov; Russian: Константин Иванович Воробьёв	"BKA-33" of the Azov Military Flotilla	Senior Lieutenant	22 January 1944	—
Nikolai Nikolaevich Vorobyov; Russian: Николай Николаевич Воробьёв	979th Infantry Regiment	Captain	29 October 1943	—
Nikolai Pavlovich Vorobyov; Russian: Николай Павлович Воробьёв	1666th Anti-tank Artillery Regiment	Junior Sergeant	10 January 1944	—
Nikolai Timofeevich Vorobyov; Russian: Николай Тимофеевич Воробьёв	12th Tank Regiment	Lieutenant	10 April 1945	—
Nikolai Timofeevich Vorobyov; Russian: Николай Тимофеевич Воробьёв	492nd Separate Communications Battalion	Junior Sergeant	24 March 1945	—
Pyotr Vorobyov; Russian: Пётр Егорович Воробьёв	718th Infantry Regiment	Sengeant	24 March 1945	—
Stepan Vorobyov; Russian: Степан Иванович Воробьёв	19th Assault Engineer-Sapper Brigade	Staff Sergeant	10 April 1945	—
Yakov Vorobyov; Russian: Яков Степанович Воробьёв	62nd Rifle Corps	Major-General	6 April 1945	—
Grigory Vorovchenko; Russian: Григорий Данилович Воровченко	307th Guards Infantry Regiment	Guard Senior Sergeant	22 February 1944 †	Killed in action on 22 November 1943
Arseny Vorozheykin; Russian: Арсений Васильевич Ворожейкин	728th Fighter Aviation Regiment	Captain	4 February 1944; 19 August 1944	Twice Hero of the Soviet Union
Andrey Voronin; Russian: Андрей Фёдорович Воронин	60th Guards Cavalry Regiment	Guard Sergeant	15 January 1944	—
Vasily Voronin; Russian: Василий Андреевич Воронин	37th Guards Rifle Regiment	Guard Major	15 January 1944	—
Ivan Nikolaevich Voronin; Russian: Иван Николаевич Воронин	1118th Infantry Regiment	Sergeant	22 February 1944	—
Ivan Pavlovich Voronin; Russian: Иван Павлович Воронин	37th Mechanized Brigade	Captain	31 May 1945	—
Ivan Fyodorovich Voronin; Russian: Иван Фёдорович Воронин	37th Assault Aviation Regiment	Captain	14 September 1945	—
Mikhail Voronin; Russian: Михаил Ильич Воронин	66th Guards Tank Brigade	Guard Senior Sergeant	24 March 1945	—
Pavel Voronin; Russian: Павел Мартынович Воронин	18th Guards Tank Regiment	Guard Starshina	29 June 1945	—
Stepan Voronin; Russian: Степан Никитович Воронин	759th Infantry Regiment	Captain	13 September 1944 †	Killed in action on 18 March 1944
Vladimir Voronkov; Russian: Владимир Романович Воронков	190th Guards Ground Attack Aviation Regiment	Senior Lieutenant	15 May 1946	—
Ivan Semyonovich Voronkov; Russian: Иван Семёнович Воронков	1st Guards Infantry Regiment	Guard Senior Lieutenant	17 November 1943	—
Ivan Yakovlevich Voronkov; Russian: Иван Яковлевич Воронков	5th Guards Artillery Regiment	Guard Senior Sergeant	20 December 1943 †	Killed in action on 14 October 1943
Maksim Voronkov; Russian: Максим Георгиевич Воронков	2nd Brigade of the Amur Military Flotilla	Captain 1st Class	14 September 1945	—
Mikhail Voronkov; Russian: Михаил Михайлович Воронков	50th High-speed Bomber Aviation Regiment	Captain	21 March 1940	—
Aleksey Voronov; Russian: Алексей Григорьевич Воронов	73rd Guards Rifle Division	Guard Lieutenant Colonel	28 April 1945	—
Viktor Voronov; Russian: Виктор Фёдорович Воронов	190th Assault Aviation Regiment	Major	24 August 1934	—
Vladimir Voronov; Russian: Владимир Ульянович Воронов	665th Infantry Regiment	Lieutenant Colonel	24 March 1945	—
Aleksandr Vorontsov; Russian: Александр Никифорович Воронцов	59th Guards Cavalry Regiment	Red Army Guard	31 May 1945	—
Aleksey Vorontsov; Russian: Алексей Парамонович Воронцов	33rd Guards Cavalry Regiment	Guard Senior Lieutenant	10 January 1944 †	Killed in action on 24 February 1943
Ivan Vorontsov; Russian: Иван Михайлович Воронцов	337th Guards Rifle Regiment	Guard Senior Lieutenant	10 April 1945	—
Mikhail Vorontsov; Russian: Михаил Егорович Воронцов	33rd Separate Sapper Battalion	Lieutenant	29 October 1943	—
Nikolai Alekseevich Vorontsov; Russian: Николай Алексеевич Воронцов	703rd Infantry Regiment	Senior Lieutenant	24 March 1945	—
Nikolai Alekseevich Vorontsov; Russian: Николай Алексеевич Воронцов	71st Mechanized Brigade	Lieutenant	10 January 1944 †	Died of wounds on 28 December 1943
Andrey Voronchuk; Russian: Андрей Яковлевич Ворончук	236th Infantry Regiment	Lieutenant	30 October 1943	—
Aleksandr Voronko; Russian: Андрей Яковлевич Ворончук	63rd Guards Fighter Aviation Regiment	Guard Major	30 October 1943	—
Vasily Voropaev; Russian: Василий Николаевич Воропаев	4th Guards Aviation Regiment	Guard Captain	13 March 1944	—
Grigory Voropaev; Russian: Григорий Яковлевич Воропаев	1140th Infantry Regiment	Sergeant	10 January 1944 †	Killed in action on 5 October 1943
Ivan Voropaev; Russian: Иван Кириллович Воропаев	4th Guards Rifle Corps	Guard Major-General	26 October 1944	—
Stepan Vorotnik; Russian: Степан Григорьевич Воротник	503rd Assault Aviation Regiment	Captain	2 August 1944	—
Ivan Vorotyntsev; Russian: Иван Моисеевич Воротынцев	1318th Infantry Regiment	Red Army Man	29 October 1943	—
Nikolai Vorotyntsev; Russian: Николай Филиппович Воротынцев	Separate Training Battalion of the 67th Guards Rifle Division	Red Army Guard	22 July 1944	—
Gennady Voroshilov; Russian: Геннадий Николаевич Ворошилов	1052nd Infantry Regiment	Junior Sergeant	27 February 1945	—
Aleksandr Voskresensky; Russian: Александр Андреевич Воскресенский	63rd Mechanized Brigade	Lieutenant	15 May 1946	—
Vasily Vostrikov; Russian: Василий Дмитриевич Востриков	126th Tank Regiment	Staff Sergeant	10 April 1945 †	Killed in action on 4 February 1945
Timofey Vostrikov; Russian: Тимофей Иванович Востриков	12th Anti-tank Artillery Regiment	Sergeant	21 September 1943 †	Killed in action on 8 July 1943
Valery Vostrotin; Russian: Валерий Александрович Востротин	345th Guards Parachute Regiment	Guard Lieutenant Colonel	6 January 1988	—
Pyotr Vostrukhin; Russian: Пётр Михайлович Вострухин	271st Fighter Aviation Regiment	Junior Lieutenant	1 May 1943	—
Afrikan Votinov; Russian: Африкан Иванович Вотинов	143rd Infantry Regiment	Staff Sergeant	24 March 1945	—
Stepan Votinov; Russian: Степан Парфёнович Вотинов	227th Separate Anti-tank Fighter Regiment	Staff Sergeant	4 June 1944 †	Killed in action on 3 September 1943
Vasily Voshchenko; Russian: Василий Иванович Вощенко	86th Infantry Regiment	Senior Lieutenant	29 October 1943 †	Killed in action on 23 October 1943
Aleksandr Vybornov; Russian: Александр Иванович Выборнов	728th Fighter Aviation Regiment	Senior Lieutenant	27 June 1945	—
Grigory Viglazov; Russian: Григорий Исаевич Выглазов	Parachute Reconnaissance Department of the North Caucasian Front	Corporal	22 February 1943 †	Killed in action on 16 May 1942
Dmitry Vydrenko; Russian: Дмитрий Александрович Выдренко	44th Motorized Rifle Brigade	Red Army Man	24 March 1945	—
Nikolai Vydrigan; Russian: Николай Захарович Выдриган	31st Guards Fighter Aviation Regiment	Guard Senior Lieutenant	15 May 1946	—
Ivan Vydrin; Russian: Иван Ефремович Выдрин	306th Anti-tank Fighter Battalion	Staff Sergeant	21 February 1945	—
Mikhail Vysogorets; Russian: Михаил Амосович Высогорец	17th Motor-Engineering Brigade	Guard Captain	23 September 1944	—
Vladislav Vysotsky; Polish: Władysław Wysocki	Polish 1st Tadeusz Kościuszko Infantry Division	Captain of the Polish Army	11 November 1943 †	Killed in action on 12 October 1943
Yevgeny Vysotsky; Russian: Евгений Васильевич Высоцкий	180th Motorized Rifle Regiment	Lieutenant Colonel	20 September 1982	—
Kumza Vysotsky; Russian: Кузьма Демидович Высоцкий	68th Infantry Regiment	Red Army Man	15 January 1940	—
Pyotr Vysotsky; Russian: Пётр Иосифович Высоцкий	80th Close-range Bomber Aviation Regiment	Major	2 November 1944	—
Nikolai Vychuzhanin; Russian: Николай Алексеевич Вычужанин	118th Guards Rifle Regiment	Guard Junior Lieutenant	15 January 1944	—
Nikolai Vyugin; Russian: Николай Иванович Вьюгин	12th Anti-tank Fighter Artillery Regiment	Sergeant	9 February 1944	—
Aleksey Vyushkov; Russian: Алексей Михайлович Вьюшков	615th Infantry Regiment	Senior Lieutenant	29 June 1945 †	Killed in action on 20 April 1945
Vladimir Vyushkov; Russian: ru:	24th Guards Aviation Regiment	Guard Captain	13 March 1944	—
Nikolai Vyalykh; Russian: Николай Алексеевич Вялых	91st Tank Brigade	Junior Sergeant	23 September 1943 †	Killed in action on 21 January 1943
Fyodor Vyaltsev; Russian: Фёдор Иванович Вяльцев	1031st Infantry Regiment	Corporal	17 October 1943	—
Aleksandr Vyatkin; Russian: Александр Ильич Вяткин	242nd Separate Anti-tank Fighter Battalion	Sergeant	24 March 1945	—
Zosim Vyatkin; Russian: Зосим Иванович Вяткин	34th Guards Motorized Rifle Brigade	Guard Senior Sergeant	27 February 1945 †	Killed in action on 21 January 1945

== Partisans ==
Name	Date of award	Role	Notes
Stanislavas Vaupsas; Lithuanian: Stanislavas Vaupšas	5 November 1944	Partisan Division commander in Belarus	Lieutenant Colonel of the Soviet Army
Pyotr Vershigora; Russian: Пётр Петрович Вершигора	7 August 1944	Partisan Division leader in Eastern Europe	Major-General of the Soviet Army
Yevgeny Verkhovsky; Russian: Евгений Фёдорович Верховский	2 May 1945	Partisan in the Ukrainian resistance	Joined partisans after becoming POW and escaping from Axis
Aleksandr Vinokurov; Russian: Александр Архипович Винокуров	2 April 1944	Member of the 2nd Leningrad Partisan Brigade	—
Juozas Vitas; Lithuanian: Vitas Juozas	8 May 1965 †	Secretary of an underground Communist Party Committee	—
Nadezhda Volkova; Ukrainian: Надія Терентіївна Волкова	8 May 1965 †	Kharkiv underground resistance	Killed in action on 26 November 1942
Vasily Voytsekhovich; Russian: Василий Александрович Войцехович	7 August 1944	Chief of Staff of a partisan unit in Ukraine	—
Andrey Volynets; Belarusian: Андрэй Іванавіч Валынец	15 August 1944	Vitebsk partisan brigade commander	Died of natural causes before receiving Hero of the Soviet Union title
Pyotr Volynets; Russian: Пётр Каленикович Волынец	8 May 1965 †	Vinnytsia underground resistance participant	Killed in action on 2 April 1943

== Leaders ==
Name	Date of award	Role
Nikolai Vatutin; Russian: Николай Фёдорович Ватутин	6 May 1965 †	Army General
Aleksandr Vasilyevsky; Russian: Александр Михайлович Василевский	29 July 1944; 8 September 1945	Marshall of the Soviet Union
Nikolai Voronov; Russian: Николай Николаевич Воронов	7 May 1965	Marshall of Artillery
Kliment Voroshilov; Russian: Климент Ефремович Ворошилов	3 February 1956; 22 February 1968	Marshall of the Soviet Union

== Cosmonauts ==
Name	Date of award	Mission
Vladimir Vasyutin; Russian: Владимир Владимирович Васютин	20 December 1985	Soyuz T-14
Aleksandr Viktorenko; Russian: Александр Степанович Викторенко	30 July 1987	Soyuz TM-30 and Soyuz TM-2
Igor Volk; Russian: Игорь Петрович Волк	29 July 1984	Soyuz T-12 and Salyut 7
Aleksandr Volkov; Russian: Александр Александрович Волков	20 December 1985	Soyuz T-14 and Salyut-7
Vladislav Volkov; Russian: Владислав Николаевич Волков	22 December 1969; 30 June 1971 †	Soyuz 7 and Soyuz 11 †
Boris Volynov; Russian: Борис Валентинович Волынов	22 January 1969; 1 September 1976	Soyuz 5 and Soyuz 21

== Test pilots ==
Name	Date of award	Aircraft tested
Aleksandr Vasilchenko; Russian: Александр Григорьевич Васильченко	1 May 1957	Pe-2, Tu-4, Tu-16, Tu-104, Tu-110
Valentin Vasin; Russian: Валентин Петрович Васин	1 May 1957	MiG-19, MiG-21, Su-7, Su-9, Yak-27, Mi-1, Mi-4, Mi-8, and Mi-10.
Gleb Vakhmistrov; Russian: Глеб Борисович Вахмистров	29 March 1976	MiG-17, MiG-19, MiG-21, and MiG-25
Ivan Vedernikov; Russian: Иван Корнеевич Ведерников	3 September 1981	Tu-16, Tu-95, Tu-104, Tu-114, Tu-116, Tu-124, Tu-134, Tu-144, and Tu-154
Boris Veremey; Russian: Борис Иванович Веремей	13 June 1984	Tu-16, Tu-22, Tu-124, Tu-134, Tu-144, and Tu-154
Aleksandr Voblikov; Russian: Александр Иванович Вобликов	26 April 1971	Il-28, Il-86, Tu-16, Tu-128, Tu-144, An-10, and An-12
Georgy Volokhov; Russian: Георгий Николаевич Волохов	29 October 1981	Il-38, Il-76, and Il-86

== Arctic pilots ==
Name	Date of award	Mission
Mikhail Vodopyanov; Russian: Михаил Васильевич Водопьянов	20 April 1934	Flew several rescue missions to the SS Chelyuskin
