= Andrei Ivanov (Bolshevik) =

Bolshevik revolutionary

- Андрей Иванов
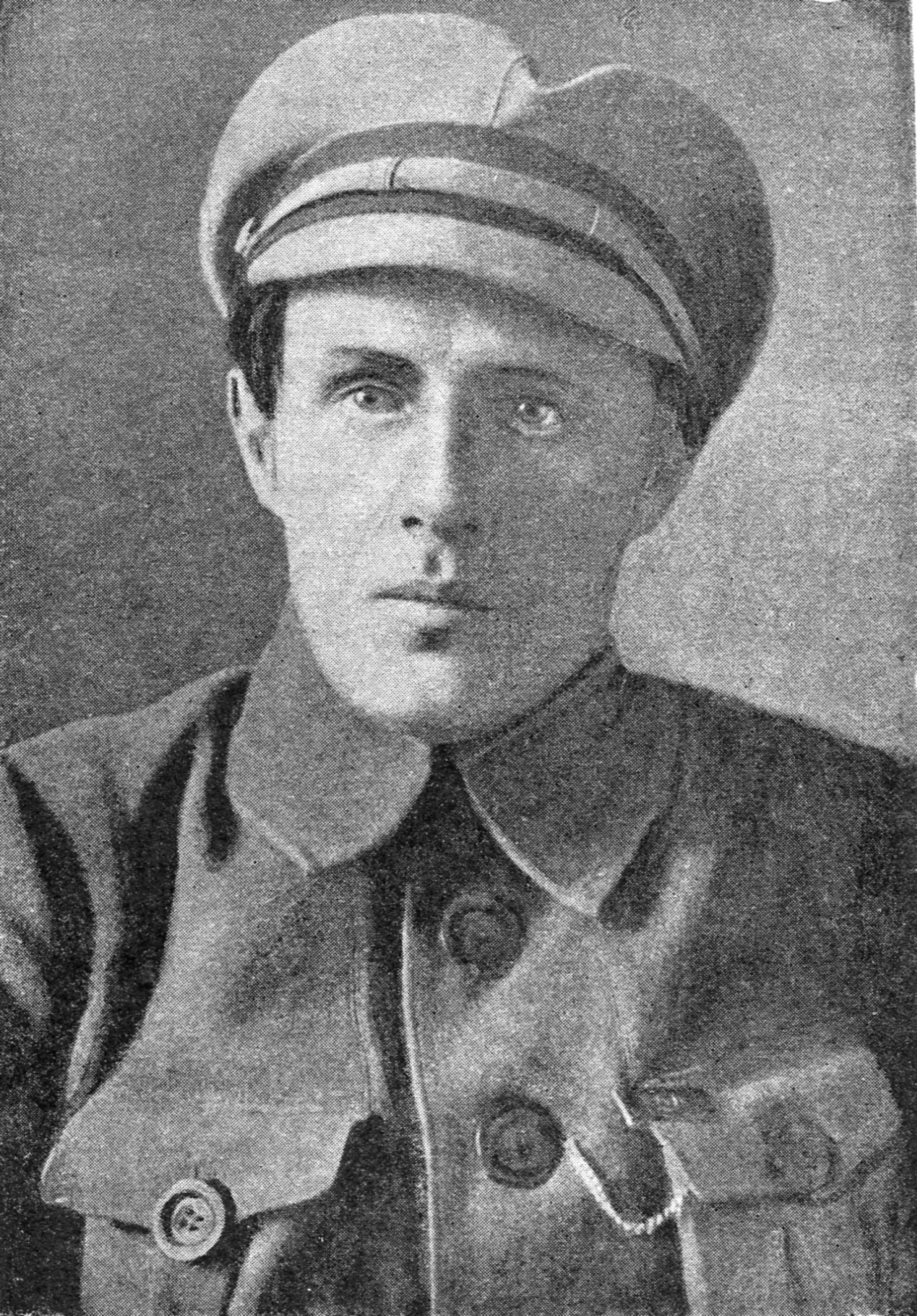
- Andriy Ivanov, 1920s

People's Secretary of Internal Affairs of the Ukrainian SSR
- In office 8 March 1918 – 25 March 1918
- Preceded by: Yevhen Neronovych
- Succeeded by: Yuriy Kotsiubynsky

Chairman of the Kiev Governorate Revolutionary Committee
- In office December 1919 – 18 July 1920
- Preceded by: Andrei Bubnov
- Succeeded by: Mikhail Vetoshkin

Chairman of the Odessa Governorate Executive Committee
- In office 1923–1925
- Preceded by: Vasiliy Averin
- Succeeded by: Ivan Kudrin

Personal details
- Born: 8 October 1888 Kukshevo, Buysky Uyezd, Kostroma Governorate, Russian Empire
- Died: 10 June 1927 (aged 38) Moscow, Soviet Union
- Resting place: Mariinskyi Park, Kyiv
- Party: CPSU

Military service
- Battles/wars: Russian Civil War

Andrei Vasilyevich Ivanov (Russian: Андрей Васильевич Иванов; Ukrainian: Андрій Васильович Іванов; October 28, 1888 – June 10, 1927) was a Soviet activist and politician.

== Early life ==
Ivanov was born in the village of Kukshevo, in the Kostroma Governorate of the Russian Empire. In 1906, he became a member of the Bolshevik faction of the Russian Social Democratic Labour Party and was a party worker in Vladimir Governorate and Moscow city.

== Political career ==
In 1916, he worked at the Kiev Arsenal factory as a party agitator. After the February Revolution he became the head of the Kiev Governorate Executive Committee, a member of the Russian Social Democratic Labour Party and a delegate of the VI Party Congress. He was a member of the Kiev revkom during the Kiev Bolshevik Uprising and the Kiev Arsenal January Uprising. At the same time from December 1917 he was a member of the Ukrainian Central Executive Committee (CIK) and from March 1918 – a member of its Presidium.

In 1918, he worked in the Central Committee of the Communist Party (Bolsheviks) of Ukraine. In February 1919, he was appointed head of the Kiev Governorate, then of the Kharkov Governorate, and after that of the Odessa Governorate Executive Committees. He was a member of the Presidium and the secretary of the All-Ukrainian Central Executive Committee and a delegate of the XII and XIII Party Congresses. At the XIII Party Congress he was elected as a candidate member of the Central Committee of the Russian Communist Party (b).

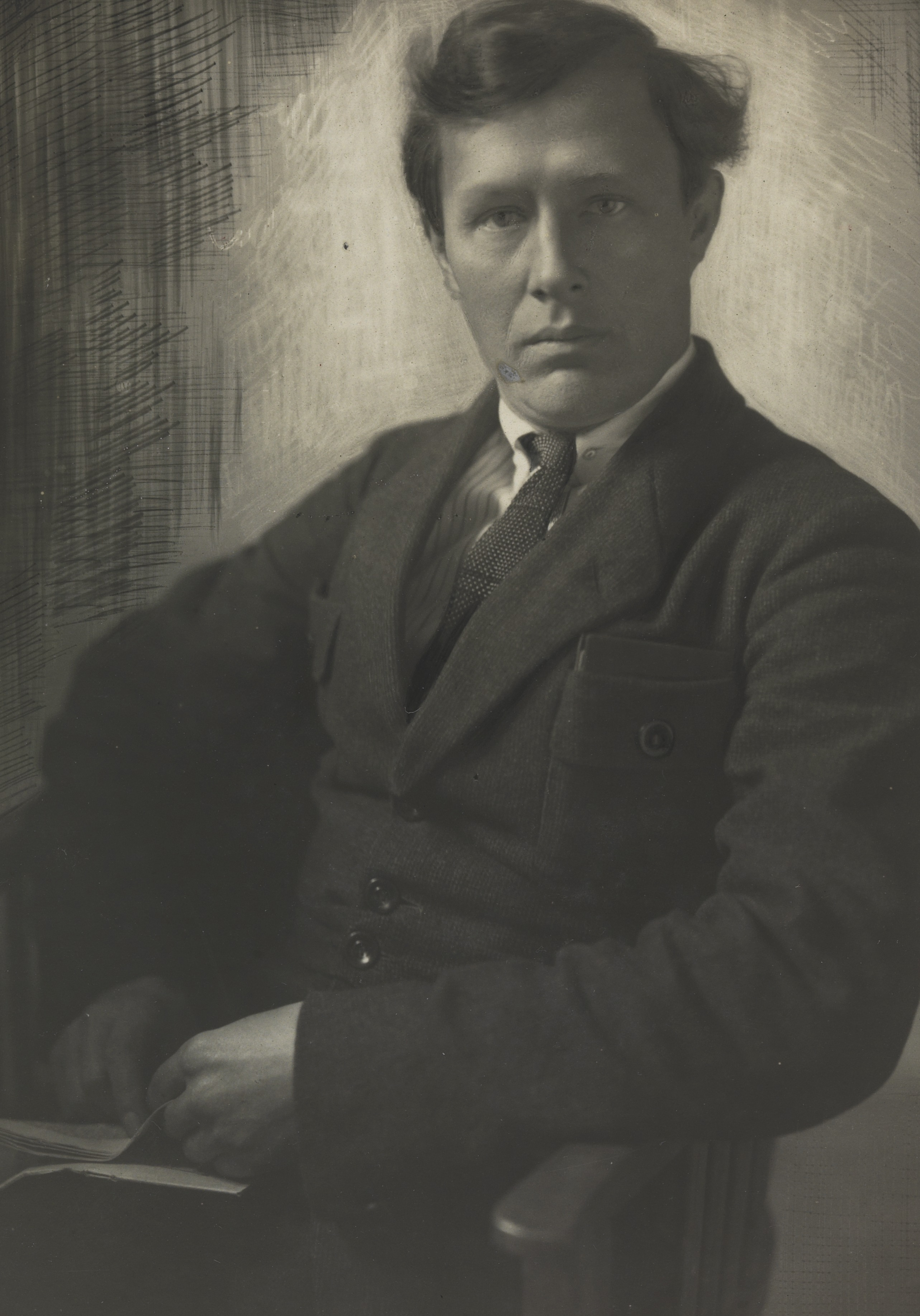
Ivanov in the 1920s

In 1925, he became a member of the Central Executive Committee of the Soviet Union and spent the last years of his life in Moscow. During this time he was the member of the Presidium of the Central Executive Committee, deputy to the head of the budget commission, secretary of union council, and deputy director of the Institute of Soviet Construction.

Ivanov died of tuberculosis in Moscow and was buried in Mariinskyi Park in Kyiv, where a monument to him was erected and a street named after him in 1927–1940 (today's Levandovska Street).

== See also ==
- List of mayors of Kharkiv
