= Vasily Kuznetsov (politician) =

Former Soviet politician and acting head of state in 1992 and 1993, (1901–1990)

- Василий Кузнецов
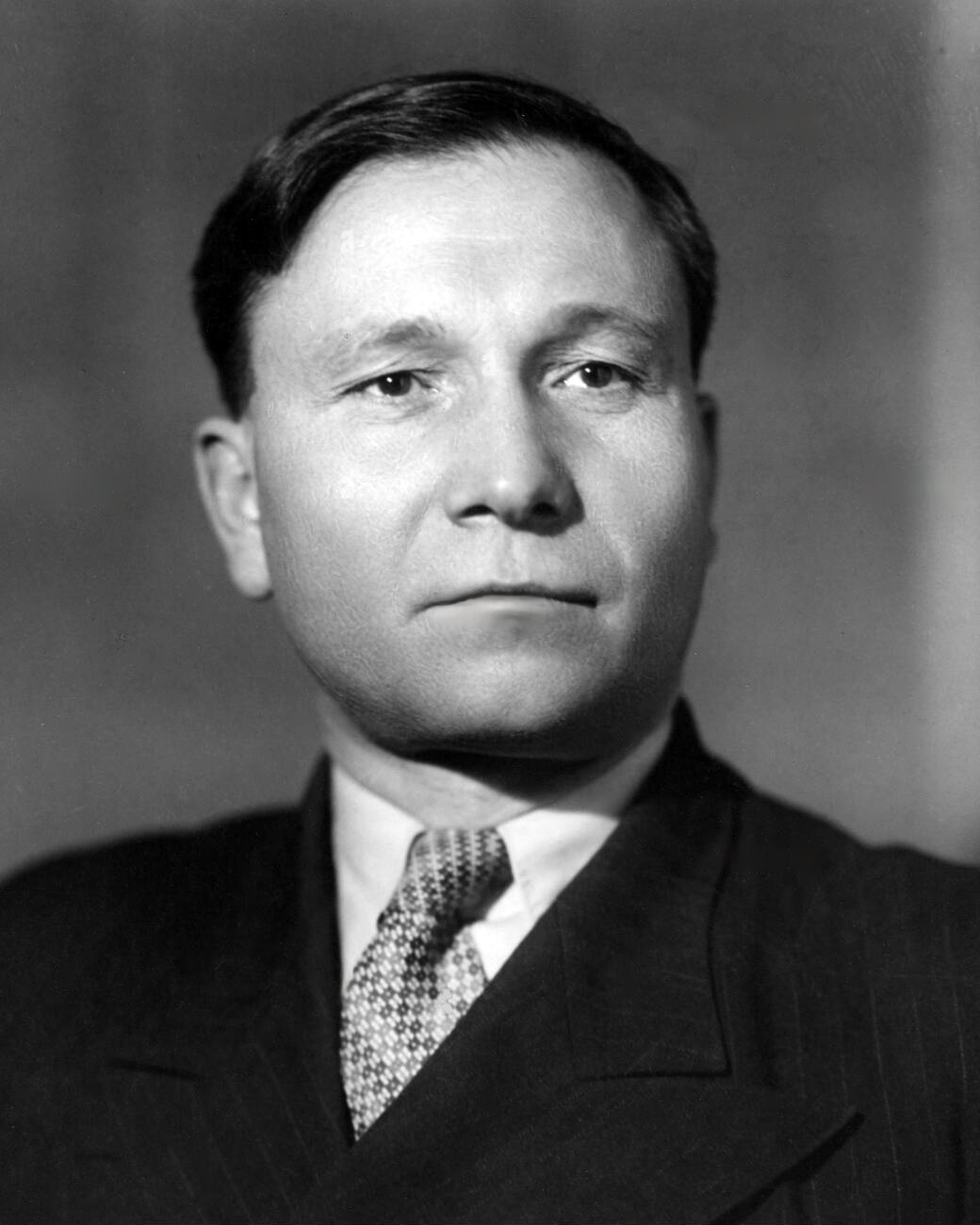
- Kuznetsov, c. 1950

Acting Chairman of the Presidium of the Supreme Soviet of the Soviet Union
- In office 10 March 1985 – 27 July 1985
- Premier: Nikolai Tikhonov
- Preceded by: Konstantin Chernenko
- Succeeded by: Andrei Gromyko
- In office 9 February 1984 – 11 April 1984
- Premier: Nikolai Tikhonov
- Preceded by: Yuri Andropov
- Succeeded by: Konstantin Chernenko
- In office 10 November 1982 – 16 June 1983
- Premier: Nikolai Tikhonov
- Preceded by: Leonid Brezhnev
- Succeeded by: Yuri Andropov

First Deputy Chairman of the Presidium of the Supreme Soviet of the Soviet Union
- In office 7 October 1977 – 18 June 1986
- President: Leonid Brezhnev; Yuri Andropov; Konstantin Chernenko; Andrei Gromyko
- Preceded by: Position re-established; Nikolai Shvernik (1946)
- Succeeded by: Pyotr Demichev

Personal details
- Born: 13 February 1901 Sofilovka, Varnavinsky Uyezd, Kostroma Governorate, Russian Empire
- Died: 5 June 1990 (aged 89) Moscow, Russian SFSR, Soviet Union
- Resting place: Novodevichy Cemetery
- Party: Communist Party of the Soviet Union (1927–1990)
- Spouse: Zoya Igumnova (m. 1926; died 1988)
- Children: Era, Elena, Valery and Alexander
- Education: Carnegie Mellon University (1918–1921); Peter the Great St. Petersburg Polytechnic University (1921–1926)
- Central institution membership: 1952–1956: Member of the 19th Presidium; 1952–1986: Member of the 19th, 20th, 22nd, 23rd, 24th, 25th, 26th and 27th Congresses of the Central Committee of CPSU; 1946–1952: Member of the Organization Bureau of the 18th Congress; 1952–1953: Member of the Standing Commissions under the Presidium of the CPSU Central Committee; 1976–1986: Candidate member of the 25th, 26th and 27th Politburo of CPSU; 1946–1986: Member of the 2nd, 3rd, 4th, 5th, 6th, 7th, 8th, 9th, 10th & 11th Convocations of the Soviet of Nationalities; 1945–1953: Member of the General Council of the Executive Committee; 1980–1986: Member of the Supreme Soviet of the Russian SFSR; Other political offices held: 1946–1950: 2nd Chairman of the Soviet of Nationalities; 1955–1977: First Deputy Minister of Foreign Affairs; 1953–1955: Deputy Minister of Foreign Affairs; 10 Mar.–3 Dec. 1953: Ambassador to People's Republic of China; 1944–1953: 5th Chairman of the All-Union Central Council of Trade Unions; 1940–1944: Deputy Chairman of the USSR State Planning Committee; 1945–1955: Vice Chairman of the World Federation of Trade Unions; 1943–1944: Chairman of the Central Committee of the Trade Union of Ferrous Metallurgy Workers of the Center

Vasily Vasilyevich Kuznetsov (Russian: Васи́лий Васи́льевич Кузнецо́в; 13 February [O.S. 31 January] 1901 – 5 June 1990) was a Russian Soviet politician who acted as Chairman of the Presidium of the Supreme Soviet of the Soviet Union from 1982 to 1983 (after the death of Brezhnev), for a second time in 1984 (after the death of Andropov), and for a third time in 1985 (after the death of Chernenko). He was one of the oldest members of the Communist Party of the Soviet Union.

Chairman of the Presidium of the Supreme Soviet of the Soviet Union was formally the highest state post. During the term of office, Kuznetsov was 81–82, 82–83, and 84 years old, respectively. He is the oldest head of the Soviet and Russian state in history (he was older than all three predecessors in this post).

== Biography ==
=== Early life ===
Kuznetsov was born on February, 13 [O.S. 31 January] 1901, in the village of Sofilovka, Ovsyanovsky volost, Varnavinsky district, Kostroma province. Vasily's father, Vasily Mikhailov Kuznetsov, was a peasant, the head of a large, poor family. In 1915, He graduated from a rural school and immediately entered a pedagogical school in the village of Poretskoye, Chuvash Republic (then in Simbirsk Governorate). He studied at the school until 1919. With the beginning of the Civil War, he ended up in the ranks of the Red Army, until 1921. After the end of the war, he entered the Leningrad Polytechnic Institute, which he graduated in 1926. In the same year, he went to the Donbas, got a job as a research engineer at the Makeevsky Metallurgical Plant. Soon he was appointed shift engineer, then deputy chief. In 1930, he was the head of an open-hearth shop.

=== Party career ===
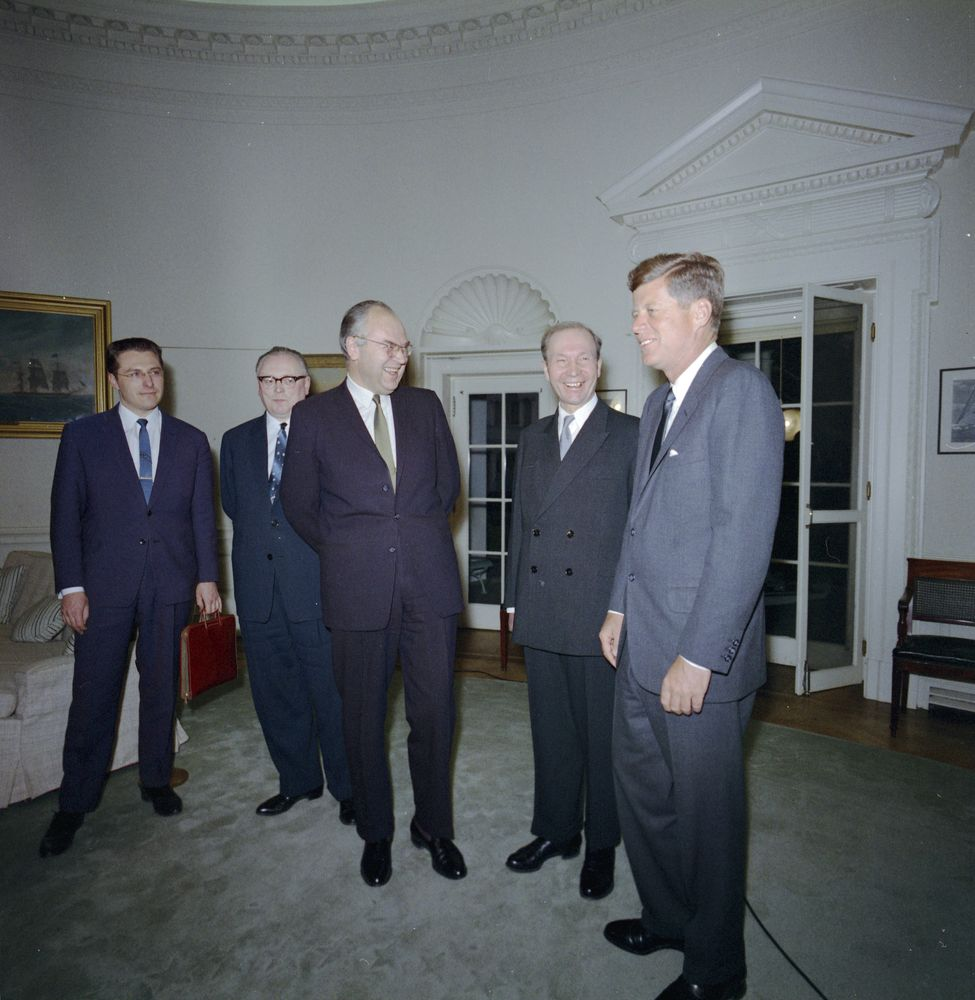
Kuznetsov (left of Kennedy) during a visit to the US in 1963

He joined the CPSU in May 1927. In 1931, Kuznetsov was among the workers of the Makeevka plant who went on an internship in the United States, at the Carnegie Institute of Technology. In 1936, he moved from Makeevka to the Moscow region, got a job at the Elektrostal plant as head of the metallographic laboratory. In September 1937, he began to rise to the highest echelons of power: Vasily began working in the apparatus of the People's Commissariat of Heavy Industry of the USSR. In 1940, he was promoted to deputy chairman of the State Planning Committee (Gosplan), a key role in Soviet economic planning. He also served as an alternate member of the State Defense Committee during the war years, contributing to the wartime economic efforts. In 1946, he became chairman of the Soviet of Nationalities of the Supreme Soviet and a Deputy of the Soviet of Nationalities of the Supreme Soviet. He held the position until March 1953, at the same time being a member of the Organizing Bureau of the Central Committee of the All-Union Communist Party of Bolsheviks. In 1953, he went to work at the USSR Foreign Ministry, for some time he headed the Soviet embassy in China. In 1955, he became the first deputy minister of foreign affairs of the USSR. After the head of the USSR Foreign Ministry Dmitri Shepilov was transferred to the secretariat of the Central Committee of the CPSU, He became one of the main candidates for the post of Minister of Foreign Affairs. However, Andrei Gromyko took the position. Kuznetsov made an invaluable contribution to the settlement of the Caribbean crisis. As an official representative of the Soviet Foreign Ministry, Kuznetsov repeatedly met with the Americans, explaining to them the position of the USSR, in every possible way preventing a nuclear war. Another major achievement of Kuznetsov is the establishment of negotiations with China after the bloody clash on Damansky Island, which threatened to escalate into a full-scale war. He was the head of the Soviet delegation at the negotiations with the PRC on the demarcation of the border. In 1971, he was awarded the Hero of the Socialist Labor after his 70th birthday. Kuznetsov was engaged in the settlement of the Indo-Pakistani crisis, his diplomatic activity at least temporarily helped to avoid deepening the bloody conflict.

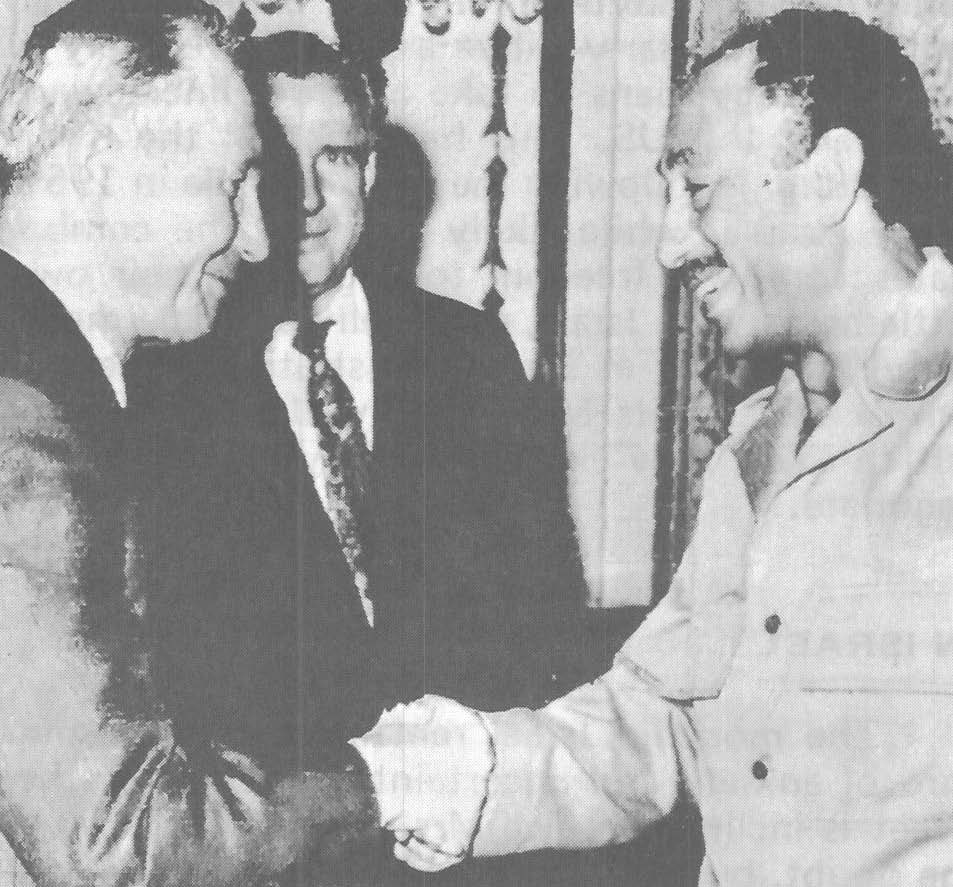
Kuznetsov (left) meets Egyptian President Anwar Sadat in October 1973

In 1977, Kuznetsov became the first deputy chairman of the Presidium of the USSR. On 10 November 1982, after the death of Brezhnev, Kuznetsov became the acting Chairman of the Presidium of the USSR until on 16 June 1983, he was succeeded by Yuri Andropov.

Andropov was the head of the USSR for a short time – on 9 February 1984, he died at the age of 69. Kuznetsov succeeded Andropov from 9 February to 11 April 1984, when Chernenko took the position. Kuznetsov headed the USSR on 10 March 1985 after the death of Chernenko. On 27 July 1985, Gromyko was chosen by the Central Committee and succeeded Kuznetsov.

== Later life and death ==
He decided to retire in June 1986 and died of natural causes on 5 June 1990, at the age of 89. He was buried at the Novodevichy Cemetery next to his wife. For a long time, Kuznetsov retained the title of the longest-lived Head of State of the USSR, but in 2021 the record was broken by Mikhail Gorbachev.

== Awards ==
During his lifetime as a member of the Communist Party of the Soviet Union, he had received several high awards and medals, including the Hero of the Socialist Labour twice.

Hero of Socialist Labour, twice (1971 & 1981)
Order of Lenin, seven times (1943, 1951, 1961, 1966, 1971, 1981 & 1986)
Order of the October Revolution
Order of the Red Banner of Labor
Order of the Red Star
Order of the Badge of Honor
Stalin Prize, 2nd degree
Badge "50 Years in the CPSU" (1981)
Jubilee Medal "In Commemoration of the 100th Anniversary of the Birth of Vladimir Ilyich Lenin"
Medal "For Valiant Labor in the Great Patriotic War of 1941-1945"
Medal "For the Defense of Moscow"
Jubilee medal "Forty years of Victory in the Great Patriotic War of 1941-1945
Medal "Veteran of Labor"
