= Voloshchuk =

Voloshchuk is a surname. Notable people with the surname include:

- Yuri Voloshchuk (born 1941), Ukrainian radio astronomer after whom main-belt asteroid 13009 Voloshchuk is named
- Semyon Voloshchuk, in the Cabinet of Boris Yeltsin and Yegor Gaidar
- Mykhailo Voloshchuk, a member of the parliament of Ukraine, 1990–1994
- Konstantin Voloshchuk, a Hero of the Soviet Union
