= Vernikov =

Vernikov is a surname. Notable people with the surname include:

- Anna Vernikov (born 2002), American-Israeli pair skater
- Inna Vernikov (born 1984), American attorney and politician
- Pavel Vernikov, Ukrainian violinist
- Yakov Vernikov (1920–1993), Soviet flying ace
