= Lyady =

Lyady or Liady (Russian: Ляды) may refer to:

- Lyady, Russia, name of several rural localities in Russia
- Lyady, Minsk Region, Smolevichi District, Minsk Region, Belarus
- Lyady, Gomel Region, Zhlobin District, Gomel Region, Belarus
- Lyady, Vitebsk Region, Dubrovna District, Vitebsk Region, Belarus, associated with the life of Shneur Zalman of Liadi, the first rebbe of Chabad Lubavitch
