= Lyady, Russia =

Lyady (Russian: Ляды) is the name of several rural localities in Russia.

== Modern localities ==
- Lyady, Karachevsky District, Bryansk Oblast, a village in Pesochensky Rural Administrative Okrug of Karachevsky District in Bryansk Oblast; 53°17′N 35°5′E
- Lyady, Klintsovsky District, Bryansk Oblast, a settlement in Smotrovobudsky Rural Administrative Okrug of Klintsovsky District in Bryansk Oblast; 52°39′N 32°17′E
- Lyady, Gartsevsky Rural Administrative Okrug, Starodubsky District, Bryansk Oblast, a settlement in Gartsevsky Rural Administrative Okrug of Starodubsky District in Bryansk Oblast; 52°46′N 33°1′E
- Lyady, Kaluga Oblast, a village in Mosalsky District of Kaluga Oblast
- Lyady, Leningrad Oblast, a village in Rozhdestvenskoye Settlement Municipal Formation of Gatchinsky District in Leningrad Oblast; 59°19′N 29°48′E
- Lyady, Krasnobakovsky District, Nizhny Novgorod Oblast, a village in Zubilikhinsky Selsoviet of Krasnobakovsky District in Nizhny Novgorod Oblast
- Lyady, Varnavinsky District, Nizhny Novgorod Oblast, a village in Bogorodsky Selsoviet of Varnavinsky District in Nizhny Novgorod Oblast
- Lyady, Perm Krai, a selo in Permsky District of Perm Krai
- Lyady, Pskov Oblast, a selo in Plyussky District of Pskov Oblast
- Lyady, Smolensk Oblast, a village in Glinkovskoye Rural Settlement of Glinkovsky District in Smolensk Oblast
- Lyady, Bezhetsky District, Tver Oblast, a village in Fralevskoye Rural Settlement of Bezhetsky District in Tver Oblast
- Lyady, Penovsky District, Tver Oblast, a village in Chaykinskoye Rural Settlement of Penovsky District in Tver Oblast

== Abolished localities ==
- Lyady, Aleynikovsky Selsoviet, Starodubsky District, Bryansk Oblast, a settlement in Aleynikovsky Selsoviet of Starodubsky District in Bryansk Oblast; abolished in May 2010

== Alternative names ==
- Lyady, alternative name of Krasnye Lyady, a settlement in Novoropsky Rural Administrative Okrug of Klimovsky District in Bryansk Oblast; 52°11′N 32°18′E
