= Varnavinsky =

Varnavinsky (masculine), Varnavinskaya (feminine), or Varnavinskoye (neuter) may refer to:

- Varnavinsky District, a district of Nizhny Novgorod Oblast, Russia
- Varnavinskoye, a rural locality (a selo) in Krasnodar Krai, Russia
