= Amalia von Mengden =

Russian entrepreneur (1799–1864)

Amalia Georgievna von Mengden (Russian: Амалия Георгиевна фон Менгден; 1799–1864) was a Russian entrepreneur. She was one of the first female money industrialists in Russia. She was married to General baron Mikhail von Mengden. She managed the Mengden tablecloth factory in Saint Nicholas in the Kostroma Governorate in 1830–1864.
