= Nikolai Vychuzhanin =

Hero of the Soviet Union

- Николай Алексеевич Вычужанин
- Born: 23 February 1919; Ashkeldino, Tonkinsky Volost, Varnavinsky Uyezd, Kostroma Governorate, RSFSR
- Died: 26 June 1964 (aged 45); Adayevka, Kamyshninsky District, Kostanay Region, Kazakh SSR, Soviet Union
- Military career
- Allegiance: Soviet Union
- Branch: Red Army
- Service years: 1939–1945
- Rank: Junior lieutenant
- Unit: 37th Guards Rifle Division
- Conflicts: World War II; Battle of Stalingrad; Byelorussian Strategic Offensive
- Awards: Hero of the Soviet Union; Order of Lenin; Order of the Red Banner

Nikolai Alexeyevich Vychuzhanin (Russian: Николай Алексеевич Вычужанин; 23 February 1919 – 26 June 1964) was a Red Army junior lieutenant and a Hero of the Soviet Union. Vychuzhanin was awarded the title on 15 January 1944 for his actions in crossing the Dnieper in eastern Belarus, in which he commanded a 37th Guards Rifle Division machine gun platoon. Vychuzhanin's platoon, according to his Hero of the Soviet Union citation, repulsed 20 counterattacks, killing up to 400 German soldiers. After the war, Vychuzhanin left the army and worked in agriculture.

== Early life ==
Vychuzhanin was born on 23 February 1919 to a peasant family in Ashkeldino, Kostroma Governorate (now Nizhny Novgorod Oblast's Tonkinsky District). He graduated from fifth grade and became a brigadier of tractor drivers, leading a collective farm brigade. In 1939, he was drafted into the Red Army.

== World War II ==
Vychuzhanin fought in combat during World War II from 1942. He joined the Communist Party of the Soviet Union in 1943. Vychuzhanin fought in the Battle of Stalingrad, becoming commander of a machine gun platoon in the 37th Guards Rifle Division's 118th Guards Rifle Regiment. In September and October 1943, he fought in the crossing of the Desna River and the Sozh River. On 17 October 1943 he was awarded the Order of the Red Banner for his actions in the crossing of the rivers.

On 21 October, Vychuzhanin crossed the Dnieper with his platoon near Starodubka in Loyew District. His platoon covered the regiment's crossing with machine gun fire. In the battles for the bridgehead, he fought in the German trenches, capturing two light machine guns and reportedly using them to kill a German anti-tank gun crew and a mortar crew. His platoon was reported to have repulsed twenty counterattacks, killing up to 400 German soldiers. On 15 January 1944, Vychuzhanin was awarded the title Hero of the Soviet Union and the Order of Lenin for his actions.

== Postwar ==
Vychuzhanin was discharged from the Red Army after the war. He lived and worked in the village of Adayevka in the Kamyshninsky District of Kostanay Region in northwestern Kazakhstan. Vychuzhanin participated in the Virgin Lands Campaign, a Soviet agricultural campaign to improve agricultural productivity in north Kazakhstan. Vychuzhanin died on 26 June 1964 and was buried in Adayevka.

== Legacy ==
A street in Tonkino was named for Vychuzhanin. There is a memorial plaque on the building of the former regional agricultural machinery department.
