= Chukhlomskoy Uyezd =

Administrative subdivision of the Russian Empire

Chukhlomskoy Uyezd (Чухломской уезд) was one of the subdivisions of the Kostroma Governorate of the Russian Empire. It was situated in the northwestern part of the governorate. Its administrative centre was Chukhloma.

== Demographics ==
At the time of the Russian Empire Census of 1897, Chukhlomskoy Uyezd had a population of 52,407. Of these, 99.8% spoke Russian and 0.1% Latvian as their native language.
