= Kostromskoy Uyezd =

Subdivision of the Russian Empire

Kostromskoy Uyezd (Костромской уезд) was one of the subdivisions of the Kostroma Governorate of the Russian Empire. It was situated in the western part of the governorate. Its administrative centre was Kostroma.

== Demographics ==
At the time of the Russian Empire Census of 1897, Kostromskoy Uyezd had a population of 181,053. Of these, 98.8% spoke Russian, 0.3% Tatar, 0.3% Yiddish, 0.3% Polish, 0.1% German, 0.1% Ukrainian and 0.1% Belarusian as their native language.
