= Vetluzhsky Uyezd =

Subdivision of the Russian Empire

Vetluzhsky Uyezd (Ветлужский уезд) was one of the subdivisions of the Kostroma Governorate of the Russian Empire. It was situated in the northeastern part of the governorate. Its administrative centre was Vetluga.

== Demographics ==
At the time of the Russian Empire Census of 1897, Vetluzhsky Uyezd had a population of 120,836. Of these, 98.2% spoke Russian and 1.6% Mari as their native language.
