= Timofey Vasilyev =

Erzya lawyer, public figure

- Тимофей Васильев
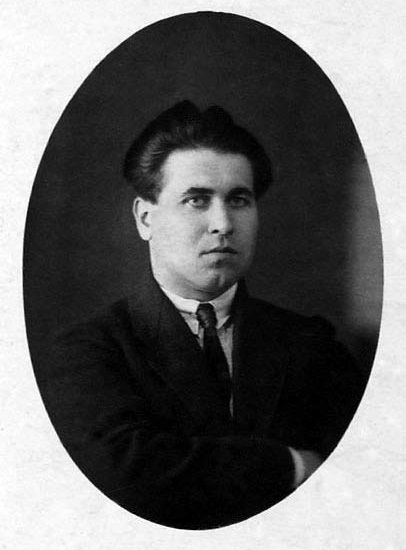
- Vasilyev in 1930
- Born: March 3, 1897; Mariinsk uezd, Tomsk Governorate, Russian Empire (now Kemerovo Oblast, Russia)
- Died: June 23, 1939 (aged 42); Moscow, Soviet Union
- Known for: founder of the modern Mordovia judiciary
- Military career
- Allegiance: Red Army
- Battles / wars: October Revolution; Russian Civil War

Timofey Vasilyevich Vasilyev (Russian: Тимофей Васильевич Васильев; 3 March 1897 – 23 June 1939) was a Soviet jurist and public figure. Erzya by nationality, Vasilyev is notable as the author of the modern Mordovia judiciary and participant of the October Revolution.

== Biography ==
Timofey Vasilyev was born to a migrant Erzya family. Having worked as a miner, young Vasilyev's interest in academia led to him getting appointed as a scribe by the local justice of the peace.

During the Russian Revolution and the Civil War years, Vasilyev was appointed the first Soviet People's judge of Omsk. He then organised the first revolutionary tribunals of Omsk and Tara. Not long afterwards, Vasilyev was elected Chairman of the gubernatorial Council of the People's Judges. When, in 1918, Omsk was captured by the Kolchakovites, judge Vasilyev became a partisan and heads the headquarters. From 1920 to 1923, he worked in the Yenisey gubernatorial judiciary department, and later commanded a battalion of the Far Eastern Republic.

From 1924 until 1928, Vasilyev studied at the business and legal department of the Moscow State University's Law faculty. In January 1926, he was appointed as Assistant to the Prosecutor of Bashkiria. After returning to the capital in 1927, he started working in the Moscow Provincial Bar Association.

On December 5, 1929, he was added to the organizational department of the All-Russian Central Executive Committee.

== Vasilyev and the Mordvins ==
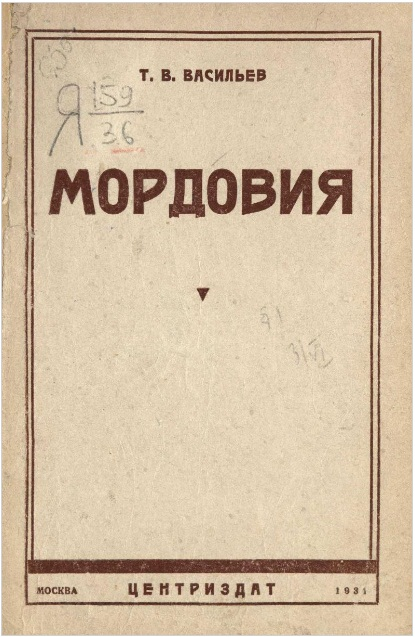
Cover of Vasilyev's "Mordovia" book

While studying in Moscow, Vasilyev actively participated in student circles of the Mordva youth, becoming the editor of the newspaper "Yakstere Teshte" ("Red Star"), an organ of the Mordovian section of the Central Committee of the All-Union Communist Party (Bolsheviks), and was later invited to work as an instructor in the department of the All-Russian Central Executive Committee. From 1924 until 1925, Vasilyev took part in the projects for Mordovian autonomy.

In 1928, Timofey Vasilyev was appointed the first chairman of the Mordovian District Court. With his participation, the korenizatsiia policy was carried out in the judicial institutions of Mordovia, as the legal proceedings were transferred to the language of the indigenous ethnic group.

In 1931, Vasilyev's "Mordovia" book is published. The book highlights the Mordvin national idea, collects differents facts about the region, including about: the physical geography, the Mordvins, the local history, the cultural and industrial situation, and the effects of the korenizatsiia policy on Mordovia.

== Trade representative ==
In 1931, Vasilyev was appointed the first Chairman of the Trade Mission of the Soviet Union in United Kingdom. On February 16, 1934, under tense international relations, with the participation of Vasilyev, the signing of a new trade agreement between the states became possible.

In Britain, the young Soviet lawyer was said to have acquired well-deserved authority among lawyers and in business circles. Once, a representative of an English firm, who disagreed with the court's decision, stated that the decisions of Soviet lawyers could not be recognized as serious and justified anyway, as all the judges in the USSR "came from shoemakers". Vasilyev answered, "Yes, indeed, I am from the shoemakers. I am a former blacksmith, and later got educated at Moscow State University. Now, in order to better learn the language and law of the country where I am entrusted to work, I became a student at the University of London".

Vasilyev's success can be considered a significant reduction (about one and a half million pounds) in tax payments to the British budget from Soviet trade. For this work, Vasilyev was nominated for a special award in November 1937.

== Remembrance ==
- Vasilyev's "Mordovia" book was republished in Saransk in 2007
- In October 2012, an international scientific and practical conference dedicated to the memory of Vasilyev was held in Mordovia
- In September 2014, the presentation of the book "Life in Struggle", dedicated to Vasilyev, took place at the Faculty of Law of Moscow State University
