= Varnavinsky Uyezd =

Subdivision of the Kostroma Governorate of the Russian Empire

Varnavinsky Uyezd (Варнавинский уезд) was one of the subdivisions of the Kostroma Governorate of the Russian Empire. It was situated in the southeastern part of the governorate. Its administrative centre was Varnavino.

== Demographics ==
At the time of the Russian Empire Census of 1897, Varnavinsky Uyezd had a population of 122,567. Of these, 99.9% spoke Russian as their native language.
