= Buysky Uyezd =

Former subdivision in the Russian Empire

Buysky Uyezd (Буйский уезд) was one of the subdivisions of the Kostroma Governorate of the Russian Empire. It was situated in the northwestern part of the governorate. Its administrative centre was Buy.

== Demographics ==
At the time of the Russian Empire Census of 1897, Buysky Uyezd had a population of 70,687. Of these, 99.9% spoke Russian as their native language.
