= Valentin Vasin =

Soviet test pilot, Air Force major general (1923–2010)

- Native name: Валентин Петрович Васин
- Born: 30 October 1923; Alyoshino village, Moscow Governorate, RSFSR, USSR
- Died: 11 November 2010 (aged 87) Zhukovsky, Russian Federation
- Allegiance: Soviet Union
- Branch: Soviet Air Force
- Service years: 1941–1951
- Rank: major general
- Awards: Hero of the Soviet Union; Honoured Test Pilot of the USSR
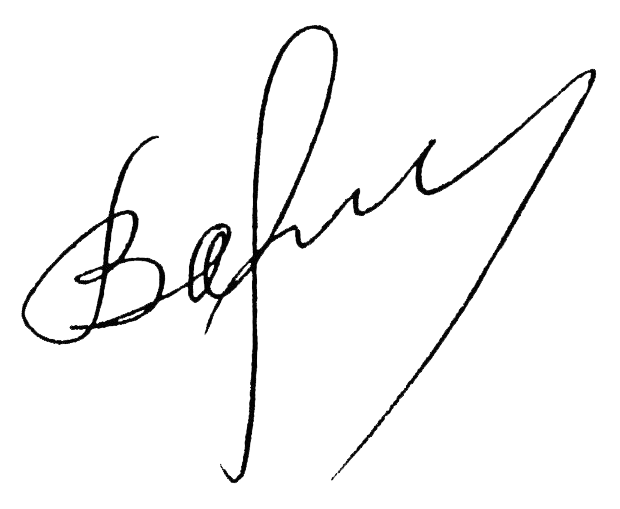
- Signature

Valentin Petrovich Vasin (Russian: Валентин Петрович Васин; 30 October 1923 — 11 November 2010) was a decorated Soviet test pilot and head of flight operations (1973–1995) in the Gromov Flight Research Institute.

== Early life ==
Vasin was born on 30 October 1923 (Note: Some sources report he was born 1 November 1923) to a workers Russian family in Alyoshino village. He grew up in Novogireyevo, graduated a high school and completed training at the Reutov aeroclub in 1941 before joining the army. He attended the Chuguev Military Aviation School of Pilots. Upon graduation in 1944 he served there as an instructor pilot until 1947 when he completed the Higher Officer School of Instructors and continued as a flight instructor until May 1951.

== Test pilot career ==
After graduating from the Fedotov Test Pilot School in 1953 he began his career at the Gromov Flight Research Institute, where he worked as a test pilot for over twenty years. There, he conducted numerous tests on new aircraft and various modifications to existing aircraft. In 1955 he conducted tests of the TV-2T engine on a Tu-4 flying laboratory. On 11 February 1956 he participated in the maiden flight of the An-8 as co-pilot, and later that year on 25 March he achieved a speed exceeding Mach II on a Ye-50 fighter, breaking a speed record. On the MiG-19, MiG 21, Su-7, and Su-9 he conducted tests of landing without engine power, and tested engine types for the Su-9, Su-11, MiG-21, and SM-12. He also flew test flights in conditions of weightlessness, including on tests of the LDAZ rocket engine on an Il-28 in 1956. On 1 May 1957 he was awarded the title Hero of the Soviet Union for his test pilot work, but continued to work as a test pilot afterwards, flying tests the Yak-27V in 1958 and graduating from additional training at the Moscow Aviation Institute in 1959. During his career he participated in tests of not only aircraft but also new engines like the SM-50 and SM-51 and helicopters such as the Mil Mi-1, Mil Mi-4, Mil Mi-8. In 1966 he was awarded the title Honoured Test Pilot of the USSR for his flight test work. He also held many senior posts at the Gromov Flight Research Institute until 2003, even after retiring from flying work. He lived in Zhukovsky, where he died on 11 November 2010 and was buried in the Bykovo cemetery.

== Awards ==
- Hero of the Soviet Union (1 May 1957)
- Honoured Test Pilot of the USSR (9 June 1966)
- Order of Lenin (1 May 1957 and 21 August 1964)
- Order of the October Revolution (26 April 1971)
- Order of Friendship of Peoples (29 December 1992)
- Honorary citizen of Zhukovsky
- jubilee medals

== Literature ==
- Balakov, Igor; Simonov, Andrey (1999). Испытатели МиГов (in Russian). Zhukovsky: Авиационный Печатный Двор. ISBN 5-93705-001-0.
- Vasin, Valentin; Simonov, Andrey (2001). Испытатели ЛИИ (in Russian). Zhukovsky: Авиационный Печатный Двор.
- Simonov, Andrey (2015). Заслуженные испытатели СССР (in Russian) (2 ed.). Moscow: Фонд «Русские витязи».
