= Lyady, Perm Krai =

Lyady Ляды
- Selo
- Location within Perm Krai Location within Russia
- Coordinates: 58°05′N 56°38′E
- Country: Russia
- Region: Perm Krai
- District: Permsky District
- Time zone: UTC+5:00

Lyady (Russian: Ляды) is a rural locality (a selo) in Sylvenskoye Rural Settlement, Permsky District, Perm Krai, Russia. The population was 1,156 as of 2010. There are 63 streets.

== Geography ==
Lyady is located 32 km east of Perm (the district's administrative centre) by road. Malaya is the nearest rural locality.
