= Alexander Vologin =

Hero of the Soviet Union

Alexander Dmitriyevich Vologin
- Born: October 8, 1924; Pechersk, Samara Oblast, USSR
- Died: 17 October 1943 (aged 19); Sozh river, Belorussian SSR, USSR
- Burial place: Gomel, Belarus
- Military career
- Allegiance: Soviet Union
- Branch: Red Army
- Service years: 1941–1943
- Rank: Guards Junior Sergeant
- Unit: 37th Guards Rifle Division
- Conflicts: World War II; Operation Kutuzov; Battle of the Dnieper †
- Awards: Hero of the Soviet Union; Order of Lenin

Alexander Dmitriyevich Vologin (Russian: Александр Дмитриевич Вологин; October 8, 1924 – October 17, 1943) was a Soviet soldier who was awarded the title of Hero of the Soviet Union posthumously on January 15, 1944, for his actions during Operation Kutuzov and the Battle of the Dnieper, almost three months after being during the Battle of the Dnieper in modern-day Belarus.

== Early life ==
Vologin was born on October 8, 1924, into a peasant family in the village of Pechersk, in Samara Oblast in the then-Russian SFSR of the Soviet Union. Graduating from junior high school in 1940, he became an apprentice lathe operator at the Pervomaysk asphalt plant. He joined the Komsomol in the same year.

== Eastern Front (World War II) ==
He was conscripted into the Red Army in 1942, and became a machine gunner in the 118th Guards Rifle Regiment of the 37th Guards Rifle Division. He fought in the Soviet counterattack at the Battle of Kursk in July 1943.

In August 1943, he fought in the capture of Dmitrovsk, a town in Russia, during Operation Kutuzov. His company were the first soldiers to break through German lines, but they were flanked by German troops. Vologin used his machine-gun to kill them and save his platoon, but he was wounded when a landmine exploded. However, he continued to fight for the several days that the attack lasted. According to the report in his Hero of the Soviet Union citation, he killed "dozens of soldiers and officers."

Vologin and his unit fought in the Chernigov-Pripyat Offensive, part of the Battle of the Dnieper. On the night of August 26, 1943, he and his assistant gunner crossed the Desna River, which the battalion was planning to cross the following day. Vologin and his assistant gunner concealed themselves in vegetation. When the battalion crossed, they were met by strong machine-gun fire from German positions. Vologin destroyed the positions with his machine gun.

Over the month and a half, the 65th Army pushed forward until it came to the Sozh, a tributary of the Dnieper.

== Death and award ==
Vologin's regiment crossed the Sozh in early October. According to his Hero of the Soviet Union citation, Vologin was one of the first to cross the river. When the Soviet troops reached the other bank, they were pinned down by German fire. Vologin reportedly suppressed the German machine guns and disrupted the German counterattack. For the next few days Vologin and his unit repulsed German counterattacks and held their bridgehead. On October 17, 1943, while defending against a counterattack, Vologin and his assistant were killed by an artillery shell burst. The citation from the Presidium on January 15, 1944, said that Vologin received the title of Hero of the Soviet Union for "the exemplary performance of command assignments at the front against the Nazi invaders, the successful crossing of the Dnieper and for displaying courage and heroism." He was buried in a mass grave in Teruha, near Gomel in modern-day Belarus.

== Posthumous honours ==
In Samara, Russia, a middle school and a street are named after him. At the house in Pechersk where he lived, there is a plaque remembering him, as well as a monument at the local boarding school. He was made a permanent member of the roll call of the 65th Army.
