= Varnavinsky District =

Varnavinsky District Варнавинский район (Russian)
- District
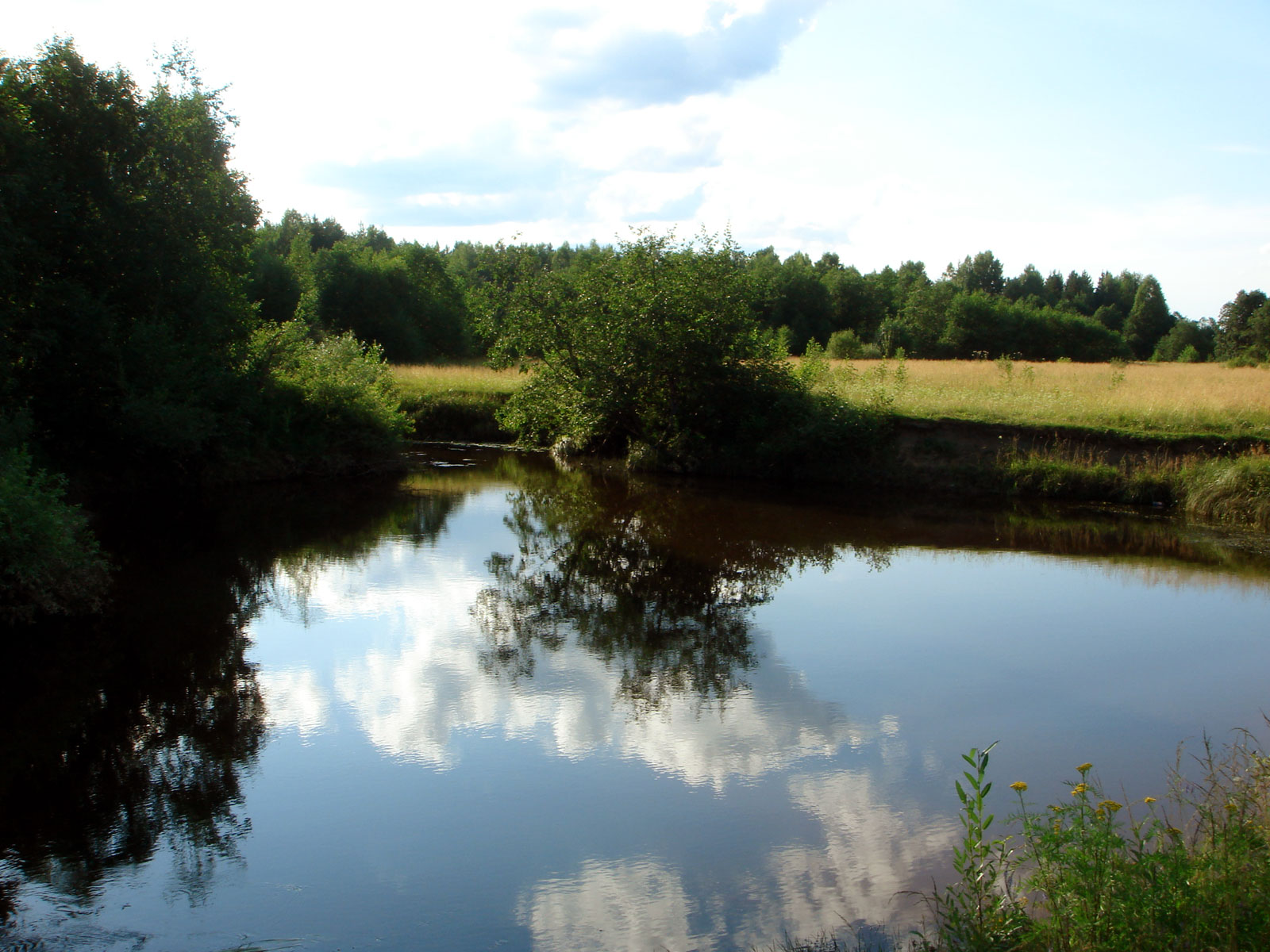
- The Pizhug River in Varnavinsky District

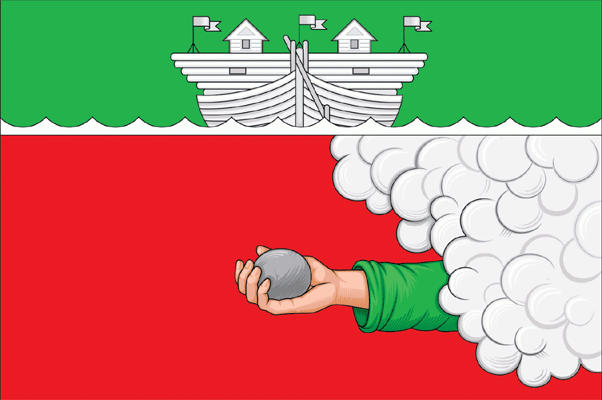
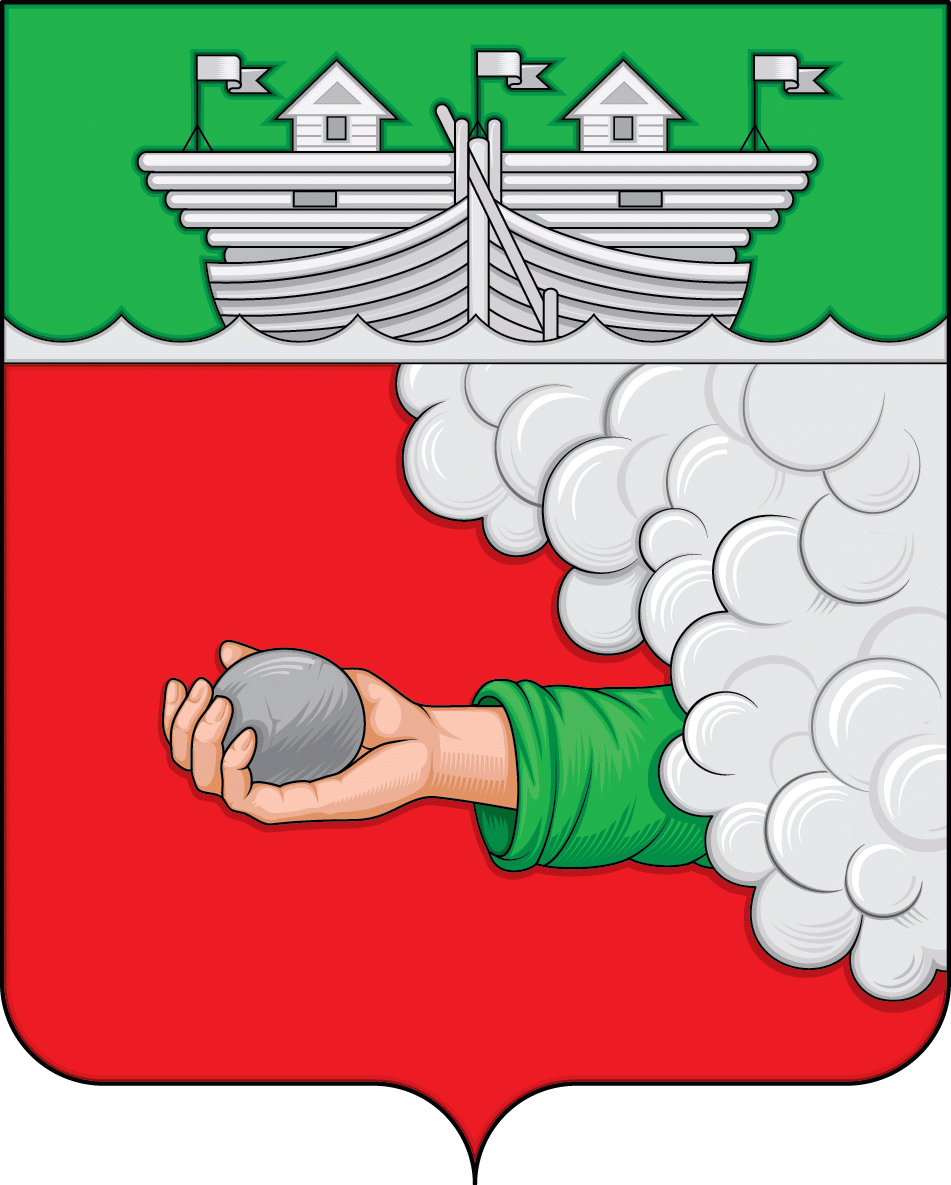
- Flag Coat of arms
- Location of Varnavinsky District in Nizhny Novgorod Oblast
- Coordinates: 57°30′51″N 44°53′31″E
- Country: Russia
- Federal subject: Nizhny Novgorod Oblast
- Established: 1929
- Administrative center: Varnavino

Area
  - Total: 2,523.4 km^{2} (974.3 sq mi)

Population (2010 Census)
  - Total: 13,366
  - Density: 5.2968/km^{2} (13.719/sq mi)
  - Urban: 26.0%
  - Rural: 74.0%

Administrative structure
  - Administrative divisions: 1 Work settlements, 5 Selsoviets
  - Inhabited localities: 1 urban-type settlements, 90 rural localities

Municipal structure
  - Municipally incorporated as: Varnavinsky Municipal District
  - Municipal divisions: 1 urban settlements, 5 rural settlements
- Time zone: UTC+3 (MSK)
- OKTMO ID: 22615000
- Website: http://варнавино-район.рф

Varnavinsky District (Russian: Варна́винский райо́н) is an administrative district (raion), one of the forty in Nizhny Novgorod Oblast, Russia. Municipally, it is incorporated as Varnavinsky Municipal District. It is located in the north of the oblast. The area of the district is 2,523.4 square kilometers (974.3 sq mi). Its administrative center is the urban locality (a work settlement) of Varnavino. Population: 13,366 (2010 Census); 15,867 (2002 census); 15,130 (1989 Soviet census). The population of Varnavino accounts for 26.0% of the district's total population.

== History ==
The district was established in 1929.
