= Varnavino, Nizhny Novgorod Oblast =

Varnavino Варнавино
- Work settlement
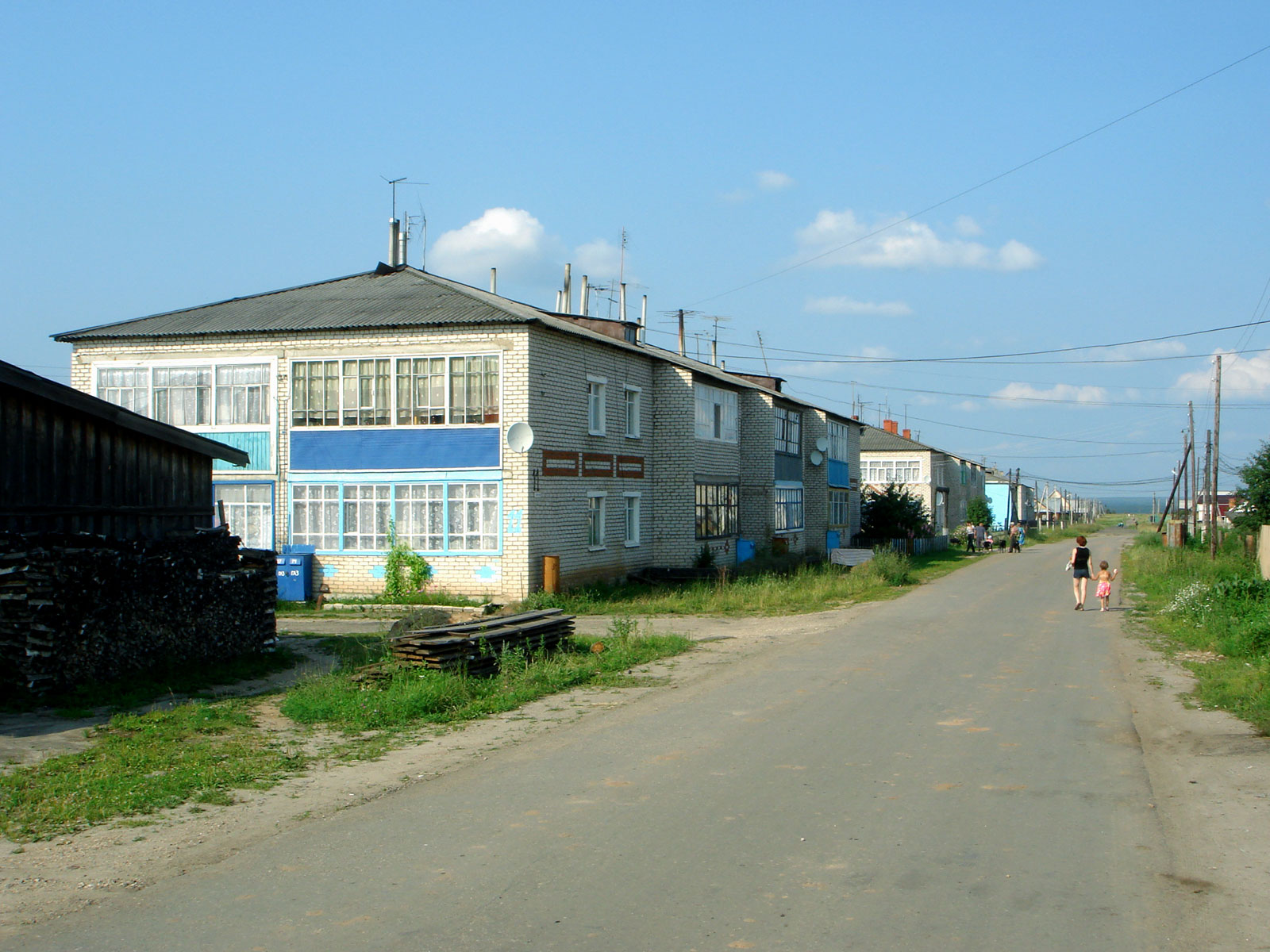
- A street in Varnavino

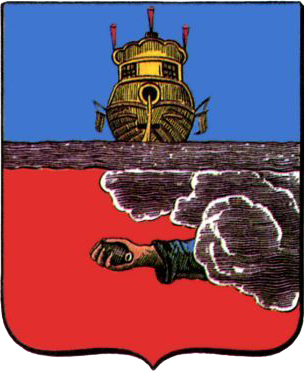
- Coat of arms
- Interactive map of Varnavino
- Location of Varnavino Varnavino (Nizhny Novgorod Oblast)
- Coordinates: 57°24′N 45°05′E
- Country: Russia
- Federal subject: Nizhny Novgorod Oblast
- Administrative district: Varnavinsky District
- Founded: 1417

Population (2010 Census)
  - Total: 3,475
  - Estimate (1897): 1,444 (−58.4%)

Administrative status
  - Capital of: Varnavinsky District
- Time zone: UTC+3 (MSK)
- Postal code: 606760
- OKTMO ID: 22615151051

Varnavino (Russian: Варна́вино) is an urban locality (a work settlement) and the administrative center of Varnavinsky District in Nizhny Novgorod Oblast, Russia, located on the Vetluga River. Population: 3,475 (2010 census); 3,718 (2002 census); 3,909 (1989 Soviet census).

== Paleontology ==
Fossils of temnospondyl amphibian Tupilakosaurus were found in Lower Triassic (Lower Induan) deposits of Varnavino.
