= Yakov Vernikov =

Soviet flying ace

- Яков Ильич Верников
- Born: 31 October 1920; Spas-Demensk, Kaluga Governorate, RSFSR
- Died: 30 September 1993 (aged 72); Moscow, Russian Federation
- Military career
- Allegiance: Soviet Union
- Branch: Soviet Air Force
- Rank: General-major of Aviation
- Conflicts: World War II
- Awards: Hero of the Soviet Union

Yakov Ilyich Vernikov (Russian: Яков Ильич Верников; 31 October 1920 – 30 September 1993) was a Soviet flying ace during the Second World War who went on to become a major-general of aviation and test pilot, working for the Gromov Flight Research Institute as well as the Ilyushin Design Bureau. During his career he mastered piloting an estimated 140 aircraft and glider types.

== Early life ==
Vernikov was born on 31 October 1920 to a working-class Jewish family in Spas-Demensk, although he and his family moved to the city of Smolensk shortly thereafter in 1921. In addition to completing ten grades of school he attended the city aeroclub, which he graduated from training in 1938 and subsequently became a flight instructor there for a short while before entering the Red Army in October. In May 1940 he graduated from the Odessa Military Aviation School of Pilots, after which he was assigned to a unit in the Belorussian Military District.

== World War II ==
From the beginning of the German invasion of the Soviet Union, Vernikov engaged in combat against the ensuing onslaught as part of the 124th Fighter Aviation Regiment, but soon transferred to the 234th Fighter Aviation Regiment; there he gained his first aerial victory after shooting down an He 111 over Kursk, and eventually rose to the position of squadron commander. From 1942 to 1943 he accumulated the majority of his shootdowns, piloting either a LaGG-33 or Yak-7 at the time. In April 1944 he transferred to the 147th Guards Fighter Aviation Regiment and was appointed navigator, and later that year he was awarded the title Hero of the Soviet Union for his aerial victories; earlier that year in July he gained his last aerial victory when he shot down a Ju 88 in the vicinity of Opochka. Before the end of the war he was promoted to assistant commander of the air rifle service. Throughout the war he flew 424 sorties, engaged in 68 aerial battles, and gained an estimated 13 to 16 solo plus one shared aerial victories.

== Postwar ==
Remaining in the air force after the war, Vernikov went on to become a test pilot at the Gromov Flight Research Institute in February 1946. While employed at the institute he participated in and conducted numerous test flights. Some of the first tests he conducted included flights on the captured German Me 163 and the Russian Yak-15 in 1947. In April 1949 together with Amet-khan Sultan he conducted the first flight of the two-seater Mikoyan-Gurevich I-320 fighter. From 1949 to 1950 he participated in flights to develop the Tu-4 mid-air refueling system, and went on to participate in the first nighttime refueling with the system, and in December 1950 he achieved the rank of first class test pilot. In 1952 he conducted the first flight of the OKB-1 150. In addition to testing new aircraft and their modifications, he also conducted aerobatic tests on several fighters, such as corkscrew flights on the MiG-9 in 1948 and La-11 in 1949, as well as inverted spin flights in the MiG-15 from 1949 to 1950. In 1955 he conducted flight tests of the TV-2T engine and the Tu-4LL. After graduating from the Air Force Academy in Monino in 1956 he remained a test pilot; That year he participated in the first flight of the An-8, and the following year he participated in the first flights of the An-10 and An-12. In 1960 he was awarded the title Honored Test Pilot of the USSR for his work as a test pilot; that year he flew test flights on the Tu-95 at high angles of attack, and in 1962 he tested the Tu-126. Then in 1966 he left the Gromov Flight Research Institute and became senior test pilot at the Ilyushin Design Bureau, where he went on to pilot the first flight of the Il-62M in 1969 and later set four world aviation records for carrying capacity on the Il-76 for which he was awarded the title Honored Master of Sports of the USSR. There, he also participated in tests on the Il-18 and Il-38 as well. While working at the institute he was promoted to the rank of major-general of aviation in 1971. Having retired from the air force with the rank of general-lieutenant in December 1975, he continued to pursue an aviation career. Less than a year after retiring from the Ilyushin Design Bureau in 1975, he moved on to work at the Yakovlev Design Bureau, initially as deputy head of the test flight complex. From 1979 to 1985 he served as acting head of the test flight complex, and from then until his retirement in June 1985 he was the lead fight test engineer. For a while he lived in Zhukovsky, Moscow oblast, and in the last years of his life he lived in the city of Moscow, where he died on 30 September 1993. He was buried in the Bykovsky cemetery.

== Awards ==
- Hero of the Soviet Union (18 November 1944)
- Two Order of Lenin (18 November 1944, 22 July 1966)
- Order of the October Revolution (23 June 1981)
- Four Order of the Red Banner (14 February 1943, 6 August 1943, 1 September 1943, 12 July 1957)
- Order of the Red Banner of Labour (6 December 1949)
- Order of the Patriotic War 1st class (11 March 1985)
- Four Order of the Red Star (5 November 1941, 31 July 1948, 26 October 1955, 31 July 1961)
- campaign and jubilee medals
