= Kostroma Governorate =

1796–1929 unit of Russia

Coordinates: 57.7667°N 40.9333°E

Kostroma Governorate Костромская губерния
- Governorate of the Russian Empire
- 1796–1929
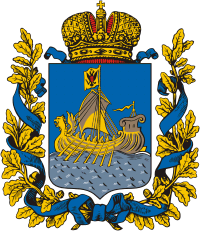
- Coat of arms

- Kostroma Governorate within the Russian Empire
- Capital: Kostroma
- History
  - Established: 1796
  - Disestablished: 1929
Preceded by	Succeeded by
Kostroma Viceroyalty	Kostroma Okrug

Kostroma Governorate (Russian: Костромская губерния, romanized: Kostromskaya guberniya) was an administrative-territorial unit (guberniya) of the Russian Empire and the Russian SFSR, which existed from 1796 to 1929. Its administrative center was in the city of Kostroma.

== Administrative division ==
Kostroma Governorate consisted of 12 uyezds (their administrative centres in brackets):

- Buysky Uyezd (Buy)
- Varnavinsky Uyezd (Varnavino)
- Vetluzhsky Uyezd (Vetluga)
- Galichsky Uyezd (Galich)
- Kineshemsky Uyezd (Kineshma)
- Kologrivsky Uyezd (Kologriv)
- Kostromskoy Uyezd (Kostroma)
- Makaryevsky Uyezd (Makaryev)
- Nerekhtsky Uyezd (Nerekhta)
- Soligalichsky Uyezd (Soligalich)
- Chukhlomskoy Uyezd (Chukhloma)
- Yuryevetsky Uyezd (Yuryevets)

== Demographics ==
Population by spoken language in Kostroma Governorate (1897)
Language	Native speakers	Percentage
Russian	1,381,376	99.7%
Mari	2,001	0.1%
Other languages	3.638	0.2%
Total	1,387,015	100.00
