= Karelo-Finnish Soviet Socialist Republic =

Soviet republic from 1940 to 1956

Karelo-Finnish Soviet Socialist Republic Karjalais-šuomelaini sosialistini neuvoštotašavalta (Karelian) Karjalais-suomalainen sosialistinen neuvostotasavalta (Finnish) Карело-Финская Советская Социалистическая Республика (Russian)
- 1940–1956
- Flag (1953–1956) State emblem (1941–1956)
- Motto: Kaikkien maiden proletaarit, liittykää yhteen! "Proletarians of all countries, unite!"
- Anthem: Karjalais-suomalaisen sosialistisen neuvostotasavallan hymni "Anthem of the Karelo-Finnish SSR" (1945–1956)
- Location of the Karelo-Finnish SSR (red) within the Soviet Union (1940 boundaries)
- Capital: Petrozavodsk Belomorsk (1941–1944)
- Common languages: Karelian, Finnish, Russian
- Government: Unitary communist state
- First Secretary
  - 1940–1950: Gennady Kupriyanov
  - 1950: Aleksandr Kondakov
  - 1950–1955: Aleksandr Egorov
  - 1955–1956: Leonid Lubennikov
- Head of State
  - 1940–1956: Otto Wille Kuusinen
- Head of Government
  - 1940–1947: Pavel Prokkonen
  - 1947–1950: Voldemar Virolainen
  - 1950–1956: Pavel Prokkonen
- Legislature: Supreme Soviet of the Karelo-Finnish SSR
- Historical era: World War II / Cold War
  - SSR established: 31 March 1940
  - Demoted to ASSR: 16 July 1956

Area
- 1959: 172,400 km^{2} (66,600 sq mi)

Population
  - 1959: 651,300
- Currency: Soviet ruble (Rbl) (SUR)
Preceded by
| Karelian ASSR |
| Finnish Democratic Republic |
Succeeded by
| Leningrad Oblast |
| Murmansk Oblast |
| Karelian ASSR |
- Today part of: Russia

The Karelo-Finnish Soviet Socialist Republic (Karelo-Finnish SSR), (Note: Finnish: Karjalais-suomalainen sosialistinen neuvostotasavalta; Russian: Каре́ло-Фи́нская Сове́тская Социалисти́ческая Респу́блика, romanized: Karelo-Finskaya Sovetskaya Sotsialisticheskaya Respublika) also called Karelo-Finland, Finno-Karelia and Soviet Karelia or simply known as Karelia, was a republic of the Soviet Union. It existed from 31 March 1940 until it was made part of the Russian SFSR on 16 July 1956 as the Karelian Autonomous Soviet Socialist Republic. The latter became the Republic of Karelia, a federal subject of Russia, on 13 November 1991.

== History ==
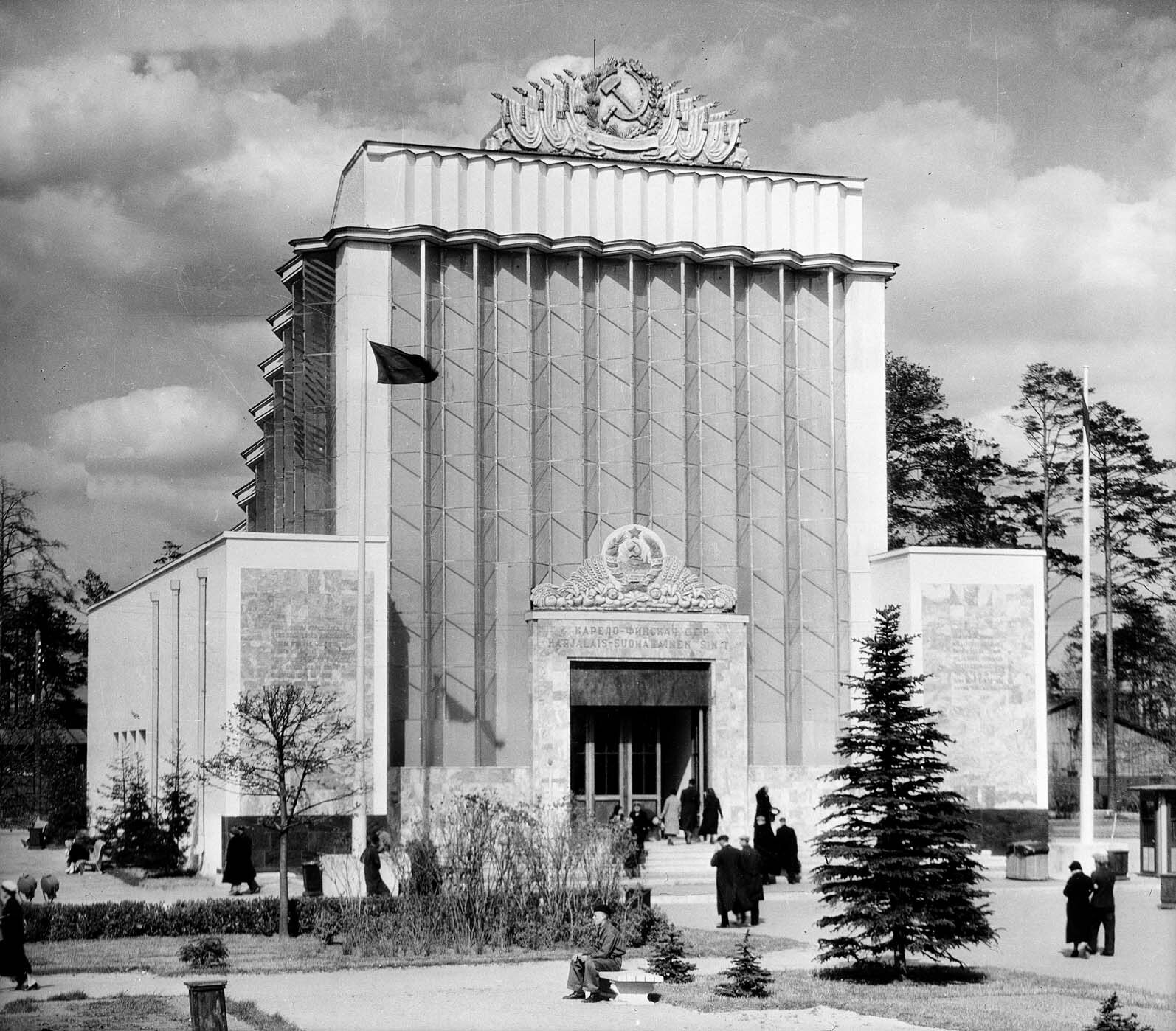
Karelo-Finnish SSR building in 1940

The Karelo-Finnish Soviet Socialist Republic was established by the Soviet government on 31 March 1940 by merging the KASSR with the Finnish Democratic Republic. The latter was created in territory ceded by Finland in the Winter War by the Moscow Peace Treaty, namely the Karelian Isthmus and Ladoga Karelia, including the cities of Viipuri and Sortavala.

Virtually the entire Karelian population of the ceded areas, about 422,000 people, was evacuated to Finland, and the territories were settled by peoples from other parts of the Soviet Union.

Creating a new Republic of the Union for an ethnic group that was not large in absolute terms, nor constituted anything close to a majority in its territory, nor had been a separate independent nation before its incorporation into the USSR, was unprecedented in the history of the USSR. Some later historians believe that the elevation of Soviet Karelia from an Autonomous Soviet Socialist Republic (within the RSFSR) to an SSR was a political move as a "convenient means for facilitating the possible incorporation of additional Finnish territory" (or, possibly, the whole of Finland) into the USSR.

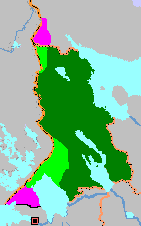
KASSR, 1938–40 Territories merged with the KASSR in 1940 to form the KFSSR Territories added to the KFSSR in 1940 but transferred to the RSFSR in 1944 and 1953

In 1941, during the Continuation War, Finland retook the territory that it had lost in 1940 after the Winter War and occupied most of the Karelian lands that had been within the USSR before 1940, including the capital Petrozavodsk (Petroskoi). In 1944, the Soviet Union recaptured the area. Soviet sovereignty was recognized by Finland in the Moscow Armistice and Paris Peace Treaty. The Finnish Karelians were evacuated to Finland again.

In September 1944, the Karelian Isthmus with Vyborg (Viipuri) was transferred from the Karelo-Finnish SSR to the Leningrad Oblast of the RSFSR, but Ladoga Karelia remained a part of the republic.

On 16 July 1956, the republic was incorporated into the Russian SFSR as the Karelian Autonomous Soviet Socialist Republic. This move can perhaps be explained in the context of the general post-war improvement of Finno-Soviet relations, which also included such steps as the Soviets' return of the Porkkala Naval Base leased territory to full Finnish sovereignty (January 1956), and leasing Maly Vysotsky Island and the Soviet section of the Saimaa Canal (conquered by the USSR in 1940 and 1944) back to Finland (1963).

A Soviet one-ruble note of the 1947 design, with the Finnish denomination YKSI RUPLA among its sixteen languages.

The abolition of the Karelian SSR in 1956 was the only case in the history of the USSR (1922–1991) of merging a member republic of the USSR into another republic. The state emblem of the Soviet Union had to be changed to reflect this, with one of the 16 ribbons symbolizing constituent republics (that in the Finnish language) removed. Soviet banknotes bearing the emblem were also changed accordingly.

In the last days of the USSR, the Karelian ASSR became the Republic of Karelia, a subdivision of the Russian Federation, on 13 November 1991.

== Politics ==
The chairman of the Karelo-Finnish Supreme Soviet (1940–1956) was a Finnish communist Otto Wille Kuusinen. In the republic, there was also a separate Karelo-Finnish Communist Party led in the 1940s by G.N. Kupriyanov.

Yuri Andropov served for some years as the first secretary of the republic's Komsomol branch, the Leninist Communist Youth League of the Karelo-Finnish Soviet Socialist Republic.

=== Chairmen of the Supreme Soviet ===
| Name | Period |
|---|---|
| Nikolai Sorokin | 7 August 1940 – 1947 |
| Adolf Taimi | 15 April 1947 – 1955 |
| Johannes Sogijainen | 1955–1956 |

=== Chairmen of the Presidium of the Supreme Soviet ===
| Name | Period |
|---|---|
| Mark Gorbachev (As head of the Karelian ASSR) | 31 March 1940 – 11 July 1940 |
| Otto Wille Kuusinen | 11 July 1940 – 16 July 1956 |

=== Chairmen of the Council of People's Commissars ===
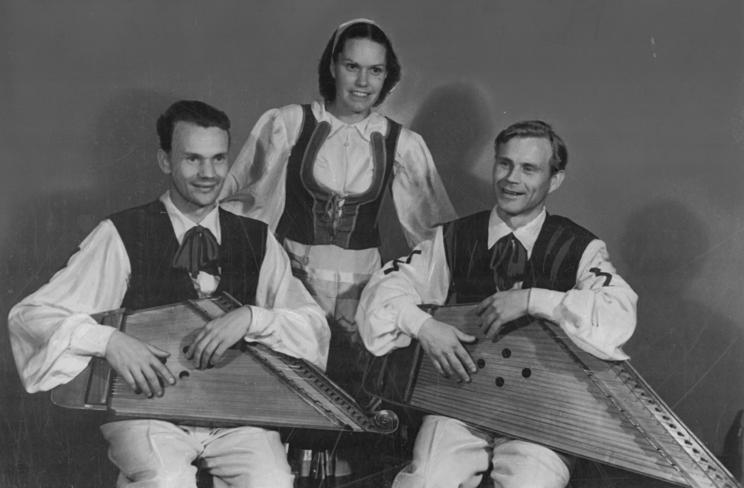
Kantele players from the KFSSR at the Second World Festival of Youth and Students, 1949

The Council of People's Commissars was renamed the Council of Ministers in 1946.

| Name | Period |
|---|---|
| Pavel Prokkonen | 1940 – February 1947 |
| Voldemar Virolainen | February 1947 – 24 February, 1950 |
| Pavel Prokkonen | 1950 – 16 July, 1956 |

== See also ==
- Winter War
- Karelia
- Karelia (historical province of Finland)
- Karelian question in Finnish politics
- Republics of the Soviet Union
- Communist Party of the Karelo-Finnish Soviet Socialist Republic
