= Yuri Andropov =

Leader of the Soviet Union from 1982 to 1984

- Юрий Андропов
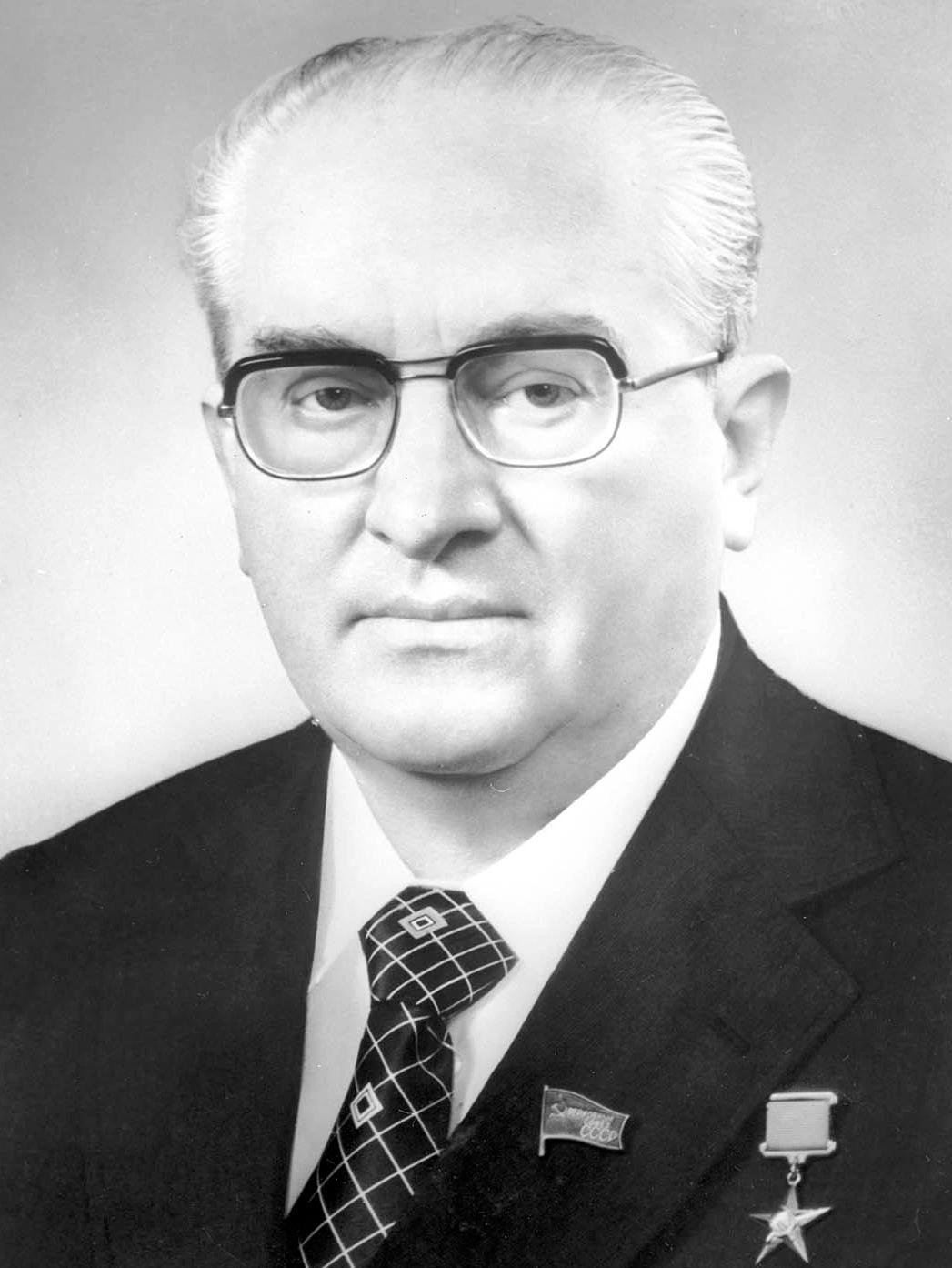
- Andropov in 1982

General Secretary of the Communist Party of the Soviet Union
- In office 12 November 1982 – 9 February 1984
- Preceded by: Leonid Brezhnev
- Succeeded by: Konstantin Chernenko

Chairman of the Presidium of the Supreme Soviet of the Soviet Union
- In office 16 June 1983 – 9 February 1984
- Premier: Nikolai Tikhonov
- Deputy: Vasily Kuznetsov
- Preceded by: Vasily Kuznetsov (acting)
- Succeeded by: Vasily Kuznetsov (acting)

4th Chairman of the KGB
- In office 18 May 1967 – 26 May 1982
- Premier: Alexei Kosygin; Nikolai Tikhonov
- Preceded by: Vladimir Semichastny
- Succeeded by: Vitaly Fedorchuk

Ambassador of the Soviet Union to Hungary
- In office 15 July 1954 – 7 March 1957
- Preceded by: Yevgeny Kiselyov
- Succeeded by: Yevgeny Gromov

Personal details
- Born: 15 June [O.S. 2 June] 1914 Stanitsa Nagutskaya, Russia
- Died: 9 February 1984 (aged 69) Moscow, Soviet Union
- Cause of death: Kidney failure
- Resting place: Kremlin Wall Necropolis
- Party: CPSU (1939–1984)
- Spouses: Nina Ivanovna (div. 1941); Tatyana Filippovna (m. 1941)

Military service
- Allegiance: Soviet Union
- Branch/service: Soviet partisans KGB
- Years of service: 1941–1944; 1967–1984
- Rank: Army General
- Battles/wars: World War II; Soviet–Afghan War
- Central institution membership: 1973–1984: Full, 24th, 25th, 26th Politburo; 1967–1973: Candidate, 23rd, 24th Politburo; 1962–1967 & 1982–1984: Member, 22nd, 23rd, 26th Secretariat; 1961–1984: Full member, 22nd, 23rd, 24th, 25th, 26th Central Committee; Other political offices held: 1957–1967: Head, Department for Relations with the Communist and Workers' Parties of the Socialist Countries; 1954–1957: Ambassador, Hungary; Leader of the Soviet Union: ← Brezhnev; Chernenko →

Yuri Vladimirovich Andropov (Note: /ænˈdroʊpɔːf, -pɒf/; Russian: Юрий Владимирович Андропов, romanized: Yuriy Vladimirovich Andropov, IPA: [ˈjʉrʲɪj vlɐˈdʲimʲɪrəvʲɪtɕ ɐnˈdropəf]) (15 June [O.S. 2 June] 1914 – 9 February 1984) was a Soviet politician who served as the general secretary of the Communist Party of the Soviet Union from late 1982 until his death in 1984. He previously served as the chairman of the KGB from 1967 until 1982.

Earlier in his career, Andropov served as the Soviet ambassador to Hungary from 1954 to 1957. During this period, he took part in the suppression of the 1956 Hungarian Uprising. Later, under the leadership of Leonid Brezhnev, he was appointed chairman of the KGB on 10 May 1967. As Brezhnev's health deteriorated from the mid-1970s onward, Andropov began to increasingly dictate Soviet policy alongside Foreign Minister Andrei Gromyko and Defence Minister Dmitry Ustinov.

Two days after Brezhnev's death on 10 November 1982, Andropov formally succeeded him as General Secretary and, by extension, as the leader of the Soviet Union. Subsequently, he sought to implement reforms to eliminate corruption and economic inefficiency in the country by criminalizing truancy in the workplace and investigating longtime officials for violations of party discipline. Under Andropov's leadership, the Cold War intensified while the regime struggled to handle the growing crisis in the Soviet economy. His major long‑term impact was bringing to the fore a new generation of young reformers as energetic as himself, including Yegor Ligachyov, Nikolai Ryzhkov, and, most importantly, Mikhail Gorbachev.

Upon suffering kidney failure in February 1983, Andropov's health began to deteriorate rapidly. He died aged 69 on 9 February 1984, having led the country for only about 15 months.

== Early life ==
There has been much contention over Andropov's family background. According to the official biography, Andropov was born in Stanitsa Nagutskaya (modern-day Stavropol Krai, Russia) on 15 June 1914. His father, Vladimir Konstantinovich Andropov, was a railway worker of Don Cossack descent who died of typhus in 1919. His mother, Yevgenia Karlovna Fleckenstein (none of the official sources mention her name), was a school teacher who died in 1931. She was born in the Ryazan Governorate into a family of town dwellers and was abandoned on the doorstep of Jewish watchmaker and Finnish citizen Karl Franzevich Fleckenstein, who lived in Moscow. He and his wife, Eudoxia Mikhailovna Fleckenstein, adopted and raised her.

Andropov's earliest documented name was Grigory Vladimirovich Andropov-Fyodorov which he changed to Yuri Andropov several years later. His original birth certificate disappeared, but it has been established that Andropov was born in Moscow, where his mother worked at a women's gymnasium from 1913 to 1917.

On various occasions, Andropov gave different death dates for his mother: 1927, 1929, 1930 and 1931. The story of her adoption was also likely a mystification. In 1937, Andropov was vetted when he applied for Communist Party membership, and it turned out that "the sister of his native maternal grandmother" (whom he called his aunt), who was living with him and who supported the legend of his Ryazan peasant origins, was in fact his nurse, who had been working for Fleckenstein long before Andropov was born.

It was also reported that Andropov's mother came from a line of merchants. Karl Fleckenstein was the rich proprietor of a jewellery business which was run by his wife after his death in 1915 when he was mistaken for a German during the infamous anti-German pogrom in Moscow and killed, although Andropov characterized the pogrom as anti-Jewish. The whole family could have been turned into lishentsy and stripped of basic rights had she not abandoned the store after another pogrom in 1917, invented a proletarian background, and left Moscow for the Stavropol Governorate along with Andropov's mother.

Andropov gave different versions of his father's fate: in one, he divorced his mother soon after his birth; in another he died of illness. The "father" in question, Vladimir Andropov, was in fact his stepfather, who lived and worked in Nagutskaya and died of typhus in 1919. The Fyodorov surname belonged to his second stepfather, Viktor Fyodorov, a machinist's assistant turned schoolteacher. Andropov's biological father is unknown; he probably died in 1916, a date in Andropov's 1932 résumé. During the 1937 vetting, it was reported that his father served as an officer in the Imperial Russian Army. Andropov joined the Communist Party in 1939.

== Early career in the Communist Party ==
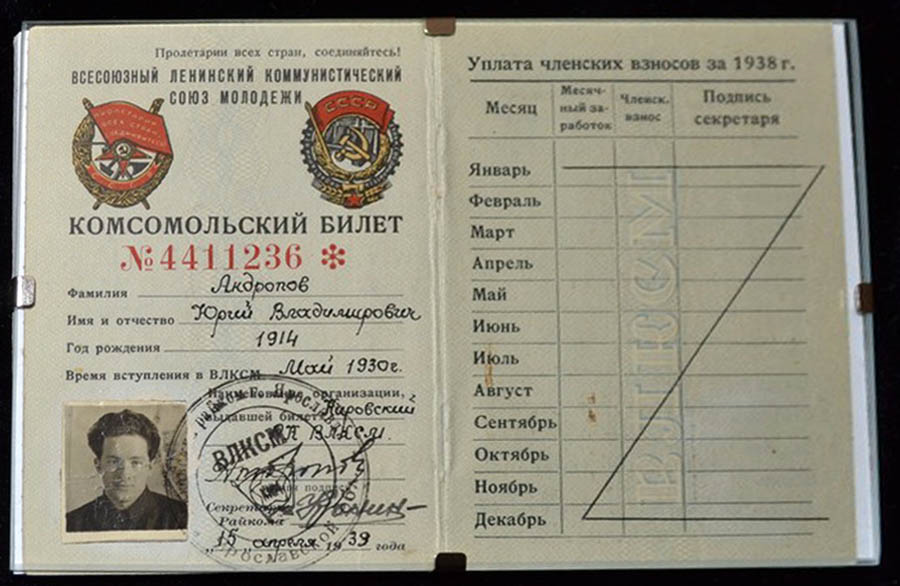
The Komsomol membership card issued to Yuri Andropov in 1939.

Andropov was educated at the Rybinsk Water Transport Technical College and graduated in 1936. As a teenager he worked as a loader, a telegraph clerk, and a sailor for the Volga steamship line. At 16, then a member of the All-Union Leninist Young Communist League (YCL, or Komsomol), Andropov was a worker in the town of Mozdok in the North Ossetian ASSR.

Andropov became full-time secretary of the YCL of the Rybinsk Water Transport Technical School and was soon promoted to organizer of the YCL Central Committee at the Volodarsky Shipyards in Rybinsk. In 1938, he was elected First Secretary of the Yaroslavl Regional Committee of the YCL and was First Secretary of the Central Committee of Komsomol in the Soviet Karelo-Finnish Republic from 1940 to 1944.

According to his official biography, during World War II Andropov took part in partisan guerrilla activities in Finland although modern researchers have found no trace of his supposed squad. From 1944 onward, he left Komsomol for Communist Party work. Between 1946 and 1951, he studied at the university of Petrozavodsk. In 1947, he was elected Second Secretary of the Central Committee of the Communist Party of the Karelo-Finnish SSR.

In 1951, Andropov was transferred to the CPSU Central Committee. He was appointed an inspector and then the head of a subdepartment of the committee.

== Suppression of the Hungarian Uprising ==
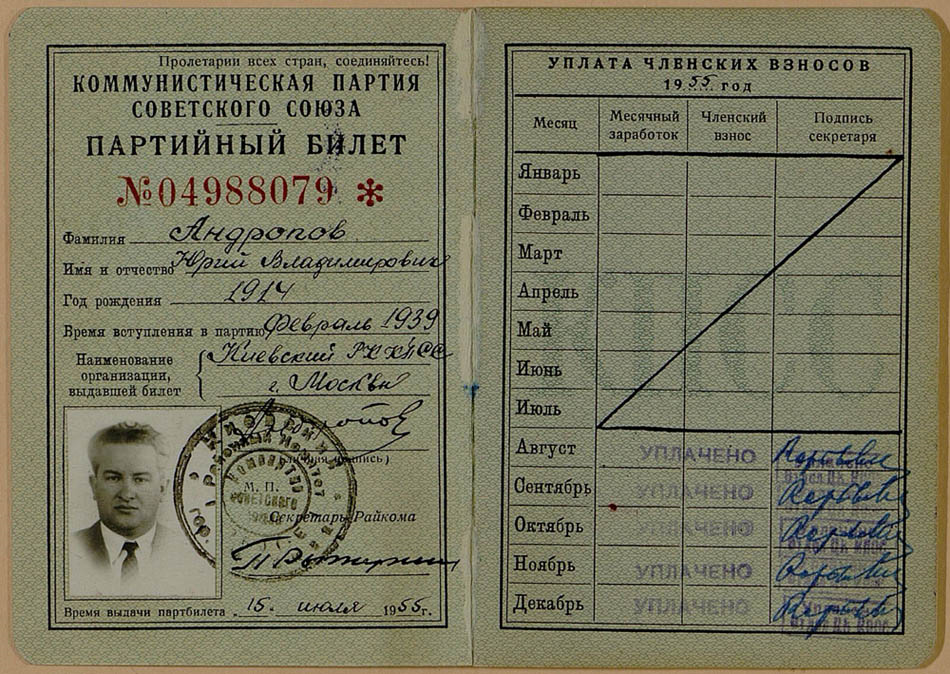
The Communist party Membership card issued to Yuri Andropov in 1955.

In July 1954, Andropov was appointed Ambassador to Hungary. He held this position during the 1956 Hungarian Revolution. Andropov played a key role in crushing the uprising. He convinced Soviet First Secretary Nikita Khrushchev that military intervention was necessary. Andropov is known as "The Butcher of Budapest" for his ruthless suppression of the uprising. Hungarian leaders were arrested and Imre Nagy and others executed.

After these events, Andropov suffered from a "Hungarian complex", according to historian Christopher Andrew: "He had watched in horror from the windows of his embassy as officers of the hated Hungarian security service [the Államvédelmi Hatóság (AVH)] were strung up from lampposts. Andropov remained haunted for the rest of his life by the speed with which an apparently all-powerful Communist one-party state had begun to topple. When other Communist regimes later seemed at risk – in Prague in 1968, in Kabul in 1979, in Warsaw in 1981, he was convinced that, as in Budapest in 1956, only armed force could ensure their survival".

== Chairmanship of the KGB and Politburo career ==
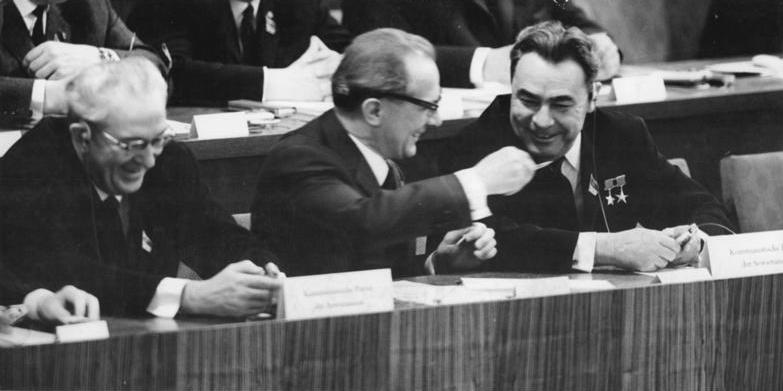
Andropov, Erich Honecker and Leonid Brezhnev, 1967

In 1957, Andropov returned to Moscow from Budapest in order to head the Department for Liaison with Communist and Workers' Parties in Socialist Countries, a position he held until 1967. In 1961, he was elected full member of the CPSU Central Committee and was promoted to the Secretariat of the CPSU Central Committee in 1962. In 1967, he was relieved of his work in the Central Committee apparatus and appointed head of the KGB on Mikhail Suslov's recommendation and promoted to candidate member of the Politburo.

In 1970, out of concern that the burial place of Joseph and Magda Goebbels and their children would become a shrine to neo-Nazis, Andropov authorized an operation to destroy the remains that were buried in Magdeburg in 1946. The remains were thoroughly burned and crushed, and the ashes thrown into the Biederitz River, a tributary of the nearby Elbe. No proof exists that the Russians ever found Adolf Hitler's body, but it is presumed that Hitler and Eva Braun were among the remains as 10 or 11 bodies were exhumed. Andropov gained additional powers in 1973 when he was promoted to full member of the Politburo.

=== Crushing the Prague Spring ===
During the Prague Spring in 1968, Andropov was the main advocate of taking "extreme measures" against Czechoslovakia. According to classified information released by Vasili Mitrokhin, the "KGB whipped up the fear that Czechoslovakia could fall victim to NATO aggression or to a coup". At this time, agent Oleg Kalugin reported from Washington that he had gained access to "absolutely reliable documents proving that neither the CIA nor any other agency was manipulating the Czechoslovak reform movement". His message was destroyed because it contradicted the conspiracy theory Andropov had fabricated. Andropov ordered a number of active measures, collectively known as operation PROGRESS, against Czechoslovak reformers during the Normalization period.

=== Suppression of dissidents ===
Throughout his career, Andropov aimed to achieve "the destruction of dissent in all its forms" and insisted that "the struggle for human rights was a part of a wide-ranging imperialist plot to undermine the foundation of the Soviet state". To this end, he launched a campaign to eliminate all opposition in the USSR through a mixture of mass arrests, involuntary commitments to psychiatric hospitals, and pressure on rights activists to emigrate. These measures were meticulously documented throughout his time as KGB chairman by the underground Chronicle of Current Events, a samizdat publication that was itself finally forced out of existence after its 30 June 1982 issue.

On 3 July 1967, Andropov proposed to establish the KGB's Fifth Directorate to deal with the political opposition (ideological counterintelligence). At the end of July, the directorate was established and entered in its files cases of all Soviet dissidents, including Andrei Sakharov and Aleksandr Solzhenitsyn. In 1968, as KGB chairman, Andropov issued the order "On the tasks of State security agencies in combating the ideological sabotage by the adversary", calling for struggle against dissidents and their imperialist masters.

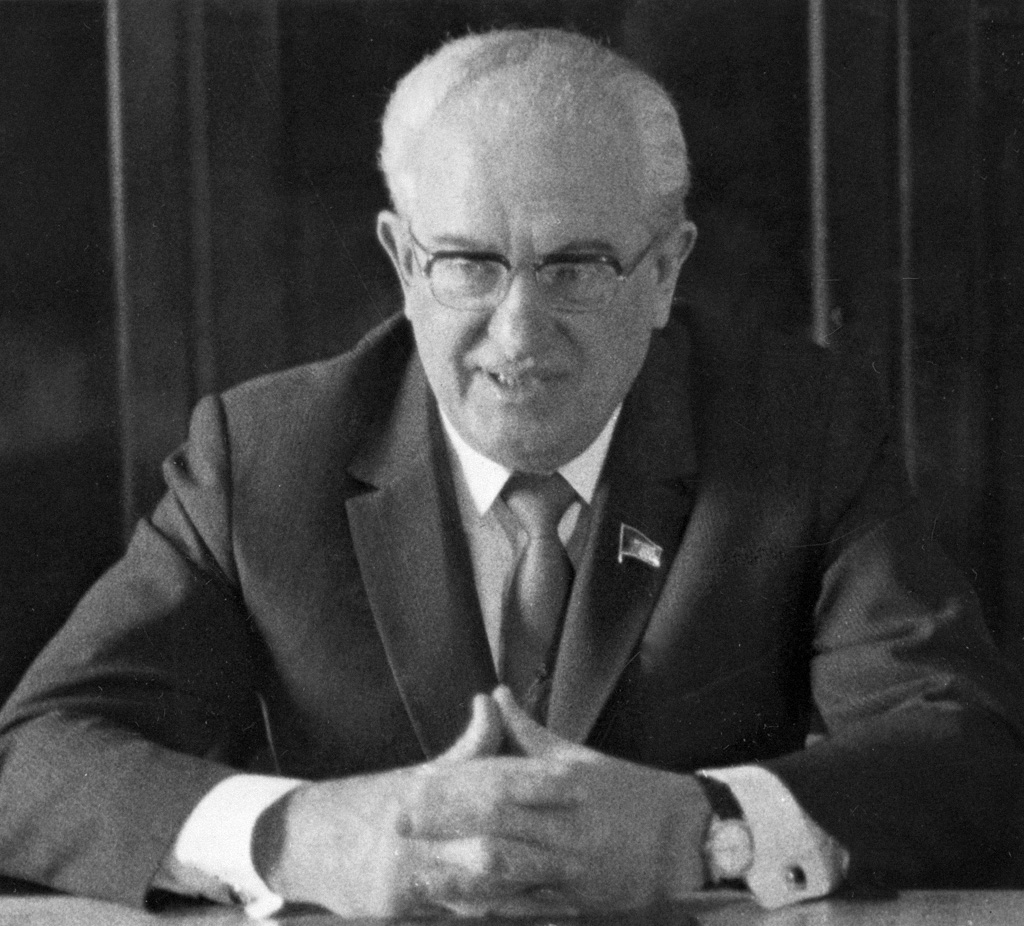
Andropov in 1974 as KGB Chairman

After the assassination attempt against Brezhnev in January 1969, Andropov led the interrogation of the captured gunman, Viktor Ivanovich Ilyin. Ilyin was pronounced insane and sent to Kazan Psychiatric Hospital. On 29 April 1969, Andropov submitted to the Central Committee of the Communist Party of the Soviet Union an elaborate plan to create a network of psychiatric hospitals to defend the "Soviet Government and socialist order" from dissidents.

In January 1970, Andropov submitted an account to his fellow Politburo members of the widespread threat of the mentally ill to the regime's stability and security. His proposal to use psychiatry for struggle against dissidents was implemented. As head of the KGB, Andropov was in charge of the widespread deployment of psychiatric repression. According to Yuri Felshtinsky and Boris Gulko, Andropov and the head of the Fifth Directorate, Filipp Bobkov, originated the idea to use psychiatry for punitive purposes.

The repression of dissidents was a big part of Andropov's agenda and targeted such prominent figures as Andrei Sakharov and Roy Medvedev. Some believe that Andropov was behind the deaths of Fyodor Kulakov and Pyotr Masherov, the two youngest members of the Soviet leadership. A declassified document revealed that as KGB director, Andropov gave the order to prevent unauthorized gatherings mourning John Lennon.

Beginning in January 1972, Andropov led the implementation of the Soviet détente strategy.

In 1977, Andropov convinced Brezhnev that the Ipatiev House, where Tsar Nicholas II and his family were murdered by Bolshevik revolutionaries during the Russian Civil War, had become a site of pilgrimage for covert monarchists. With the Politburo's approval, the house, deemed to be not of "sufficient historical significance", was demolished in September 1977, less than a year before the murders' 60th anniversary.

According to Yaakov Kedmi, Andropov was particularly keen to persecute any sign of Zionism in order to distance himself from his Jewish heritage. He was personally responsible for orchestrating the arrest and persecution of Soviet Jewish activist Natan Sharansky.

=== Role in the invasion of Afghanistan ===
In March 1979, Andropov and the Politburo initially opposed military intervention in Afghanistan. Among their concerns were that the international community would blame the USSR for its "aggression" and that the upcoming SALT II negotiation meeting with U.S. President Jimmy Carter would be derailed. Andropov changed his mind after the assassination of Nur Muhammad Taraki and Hafizullah Amin's seizure of power. He became convinced that the CIA had recruited Amin to create a pro-Western expansionist "New Great Ottoman Empire" that would attempt to dominate Soviet Central Asia. Andropov's bottom line, "under no circumstances can we lose Afghanistan", led him and the Politburo to invade Afghanistan on 24 December 1979. The invasion led to the extended Soviet–Afghan War (1979–1989) and a boycott of the 1980 Summer Olympic Games in Moscow by 66 countries, something of concern to Andropov since spring 1979. Some have proposed that the Soviet–Afghan War also played an important role in the Soviet Union's dissolution.

=== Role in the non-invasion of Poland ===
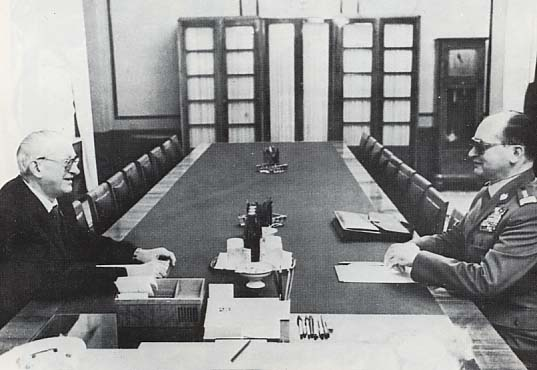
General Wojciech Jaruzelski meeting Andropov during the 1982 crisis

On 10 December 1981, in the face of Poland's Solidarity movement, Andropov, Soviet Second Secretary Mikhail Suslov, and Polish First Secretary Wojciech Jaruzelski persuaded Brezhnev that it would be counterproductive for Soviet forces to invade Poland. This effectively marked the end of the Brezhnev Doctrine. The pacification of Poland was thus left to Jaruzelski, Kiszczak and their Polish forces.

=== Promotion of Gorbachev ===
From 1980 to 1982, while still chair of the KGB, Andropov opposed plans to occupy Poland after the emergence of the Solidarity movement and promoted reform-minded party cadres, including Mikhail Gorbachev. Andropov was the longest-serving KGB chairman and did not resign as head of the KGB until May 1982, when he was again promoted to the Secretariat to succeed Mikhail Suslov as secretary responsible for ideological affairs.

== Leader of the Soviet Union (1982–1984) ==
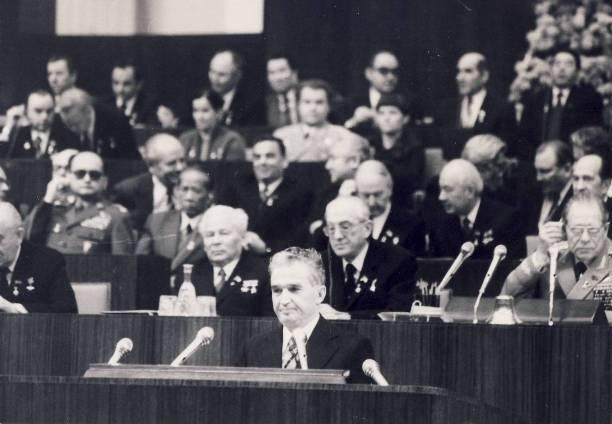
Andropov (seated second from right in the front row) presides over the USSR's 60th Anniversary shortly after succeeding Brezhnev as its leader.

Two days after Brezhnev's death, on 12 November 1982, Andropov was elected general secretary of the CPSU, the first former head of the KGB to become general secretary. His appointment was received in the West with apprehension in view of his roles in the KGB and in Hungary. At the time his personal background was a mystery in the West, with major newspapers printing detailed profiles of him that were inconsistent and in several cases fabricated.

Andropov divided responsibilities in the Politburo with his chief deputy, Konstantin Chernenko. Andropov took control of organizing the work of the Politburo, supervising national defense, supervising the main issues of domestic and foreign policy and foreign trade, and making leadership assignments in the top ranks of the party and the government. Chernenko handled espionage, KGB, the Interior Ministry, party organs, ideology, organizational matters, propaganda, culture, science, and higher education. He was also given charge of the Central Committee. It was far too much for Chernenko to handle, and other Politburo members were not given major assignments.

=== Domestic policy ===
An August 1983 CIA profile of Andropov

==== Economy ====
At home, Andropov attempted to improve the USSR's economy by increasing its workforce's efficiency. He cracked down on Soviet laborers' lack of discipline by decreeing the arrest of absentee employees and penalties for tardiness. For the first time, the facts about economic stagnation and obstacles to scientific progress were made available to the public and open to criticism. Furthermore, Andropov gave select industries greater autonomy from state regulations and enabled factory managers to retain control over more of their profits. Such policies resulted in a 4% rise in industrial output and increased investment in new technologies such as robotics.

Despite such reforms, Andropov refused to consider any changes that sought to dispense with the planned economy introduced under Joseph Stalin. In his memoirs, Gorbachev wrote that when Andropov was the leader, Gorbachev and Gosplan chairman Nikolai Ryzhkov asked him for access to real budget figures. "You are asking too much", Andropov responded. "The budget is off limits to you."

==== Anti-corruption campaign ====
In contrast to Brezhnev's policy of avoiding conflicts and dismissals, Andropov began to fight violations of party, state and labor discipline, which led to significant personnel changes during an anti-corruption campaign against many of Brezhnev's cronies. During his 15 months in office, Andropov dismissed 18 ministers and 37 first secretaries of obkoms, kraikoms and Central Committees of Communist Parties of Soviet Republics, and criminal cases against high-level party and state officials were started. Biographers including Solovyov and Klepikova and Zhores Medvedev have discussed the complex possibilities underlying the motivations of anti-corruption campaigning in the Soviet Union during the 1970s and early 1980s: it is true that Andropov fought corruption for moral, ethical, ascetic, and ideological reasons, but it was also an effective way for party members from the police and security organizations to defeat competitors for power at the party's senior levels. Thus Andropov himself, as well as such protégés as Eduard Shevardnadze, could advance their power by the same efforts that also promised to be better for the country in terms of justice, economic performance, and even defense readiness (which depended on economic performance). Part of the complexity is that in the Brezhnev era, corruption was pervasive and implicitly tolerated (though officially denied), and many members of the police and security organizations participated in it to various degrees, but only those organizations had access to the power to measure it and monitor its details. In such an environment, anti-corruption campaigning is a way for police and security people to appear to be cleaning up villains' malfeasance and coincidentally increasing their own power, when in fact one set of antiheroes may be defeating another set in a morally gray power struggle.

=== Foreign policy ===
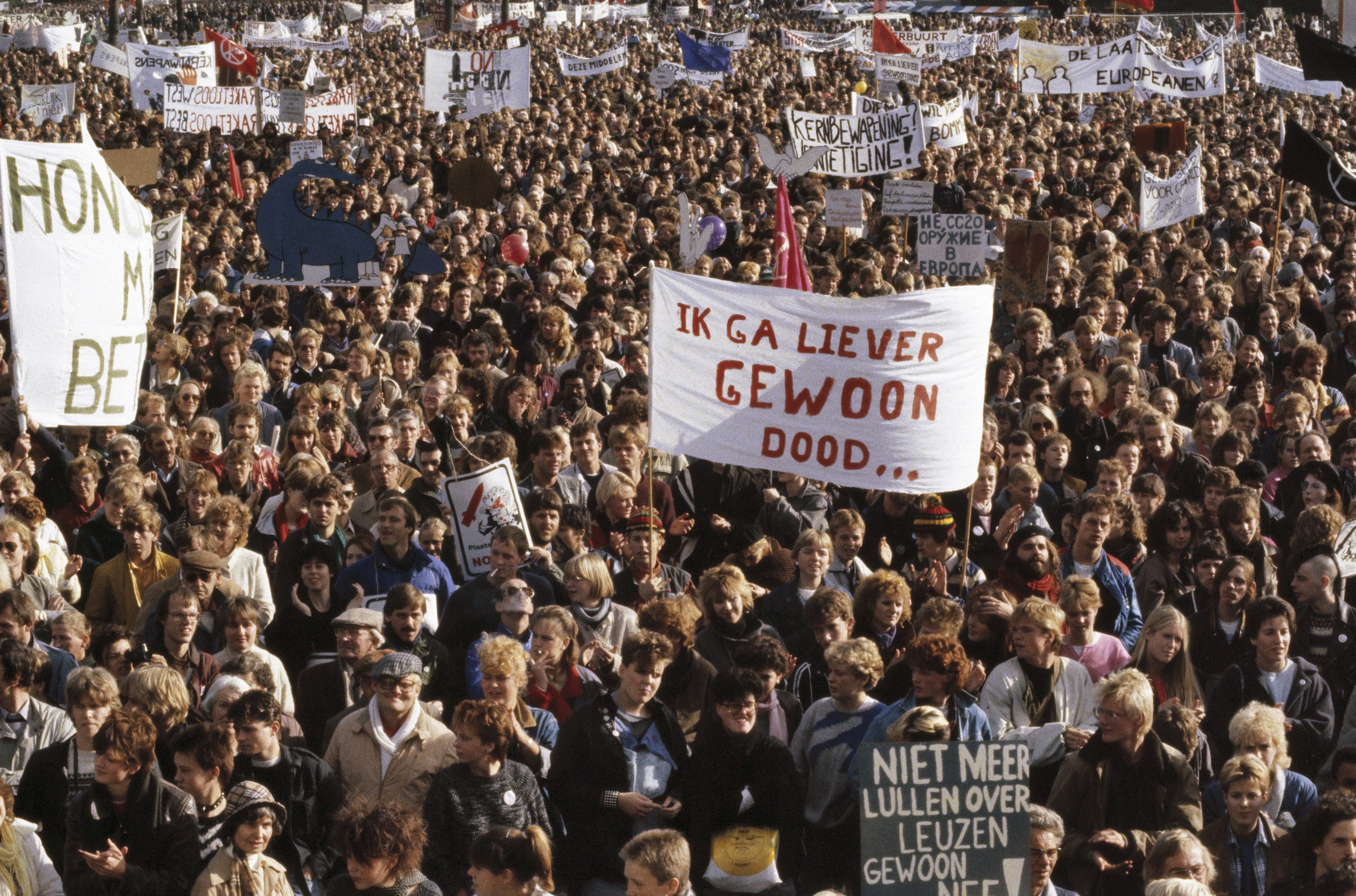
Protest against the nuclear arms race between the U.S./NATO and the Soviet Union, The Hague, Netherlands, 1983

Andropov faced a series of foreign policy crises: the hopeless situation of the Soviet army in Afghanistan, threatened revolt in Poland, growing animosity with China, the polarization threat of war in the Middle East, and civil strife in Ethiopia and South Africa. The most critical threat was the "Second Cold War" U.S. President Ronald Reagan launched, and the specific attack of rolling back what he called the "Evil Empire". Reagan used American economic power and Soviet economic weakness to escalate massive spending on the Cold War, emphasizing technology that Moscow lacked. The main response was to raise the Soviet military budget to 70% of the total budget and supply billions of dollars of military aid to Syria, Iraq, Libya, South Yemen, the Palestine Liberation Organization, Cuba, and North Korea. That included tanks and armored troop carriers, hundreds of fighter planes, anti-aircraft systems, artillery systems, and other high‑tech equipment of which the USSR was its allies' main supplier. Andropov's main goal was to avoid an open war.

In foreign policy, the conflict in Afghanistan continued even though Andropov, who now felt the invasion was a mistake, half-heartedly explored options for a negotiated withdrawal. Andropov's rule was also marked by deterioration of relations with the United States. During a much-publicized "walk in the woods" with Soviet dignitary Yuli Kvitsinsky, American diplomat Paul Nitze suggested a compromise for reducing nuclear missiles in Europe on both sides that the Politburo ignored. Kvitsinsky later wrote that, despite his efforts, the Soviet leadership was not interested in compromise, instead calculating that peace movements in the West would force the Americans to capitulate. On 8 March 1983, Reagan called the Soviet Union an "evil empire". On 23 March, he announced the Strategic Defense Initiative. Reagan claimed this research program into ballistic missile defense was "consistent with our obligations under the ABM Treaty". Andropov dismissed this claim, saying, "It is time they [Washington] stopped ... search[ing] for the best ways of unleashing nuclear war. ... Engaging in this is not just irresponsible. It is insane".

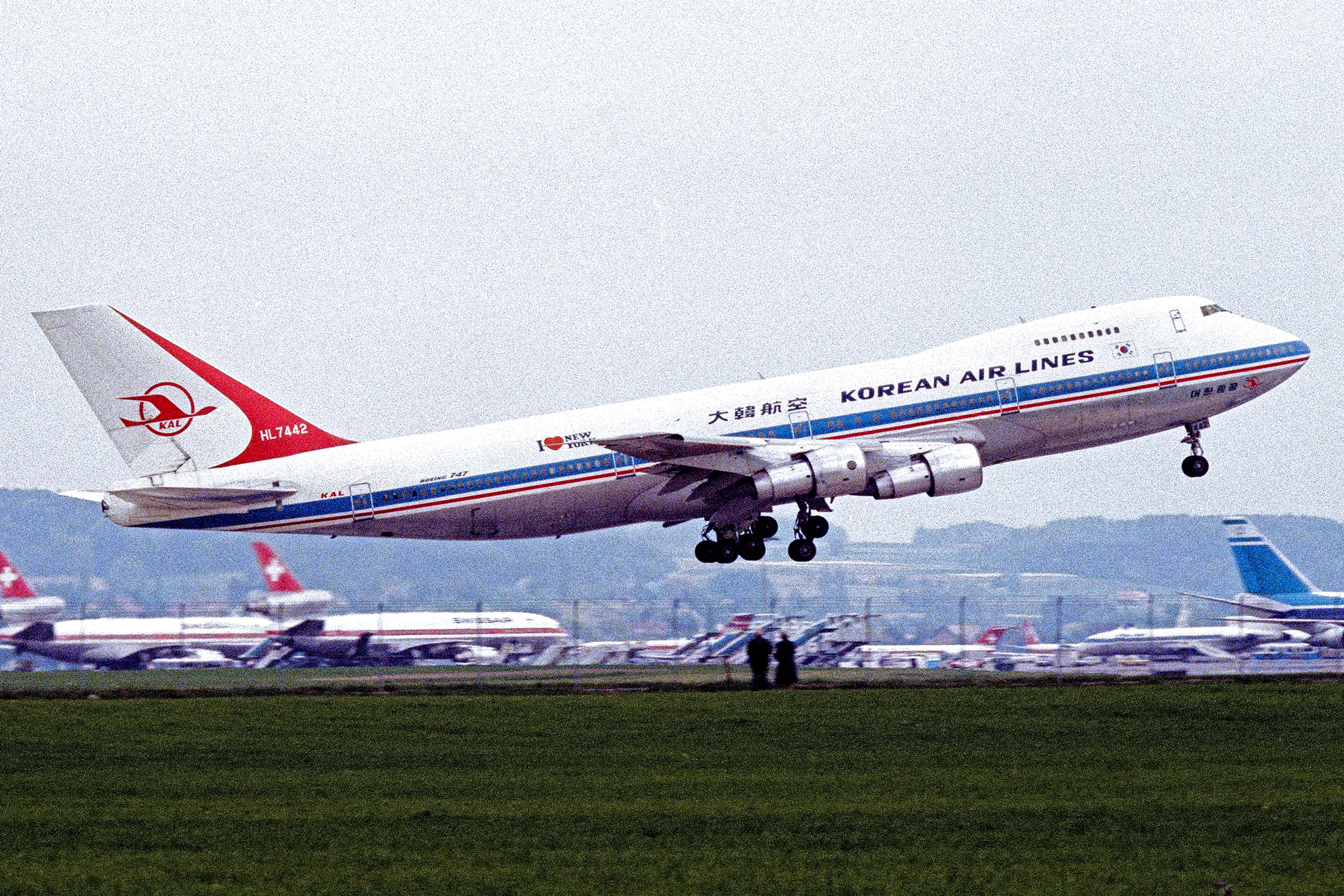
A photograph of Korean Air Lines HL7442, the airliner shot down by Soviet aircraft after drifting into prohibited airspace during the KAL 007 Flight.

In August 1983, Andropov made an announcement that the USSR would stop all work on space-based weapons. One of his most notable acts as leader of the Soviet Union was in response to a letter from a 10-year-old American child, Samantha Smith, inviting her to the Soviet Union. She came, but he was too ill to meet with her, thus revealing his grave condition to the world. Meanwhile, the Soviet Union suspended talks with the U.S. on intermediate-range nuclear weapons in Europe in November 1983, and by the end of the year the Soviets had broken off all arms control negotiations.

Massive bad publicity worldwide came when Soviet fighters shot down a civilian jet liner, Korean Air Flight KAL-007, which carried 269 passengers and crew. It had strayed over the Soviet Union on 1 September 1983 on its scheduled route from Anchorage, Alaska, to Seoul, South Korea. Andropov kept secret that the Soviet Union held in its possession the black box from KAL 007 that proved the pilot had made a typographical error when entering data in the automatic pilot. The Soviet air defence system was unprepared to deal with a civilian airliner, and the shooting down was a matter of following orders without question. Instead of admitting an accident, Soviet media proclaimed a brave decision to meet a Western provocation.

== Death and funeral ==
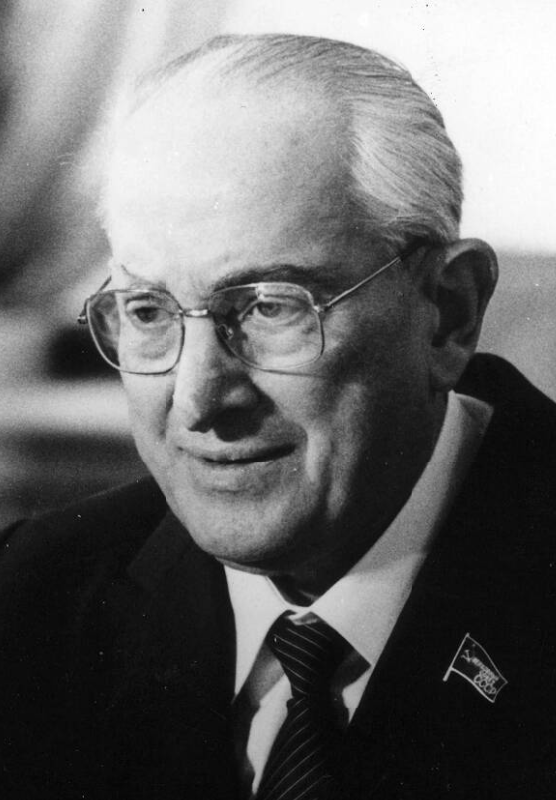
Andropov in July 1983, less than a year before his death

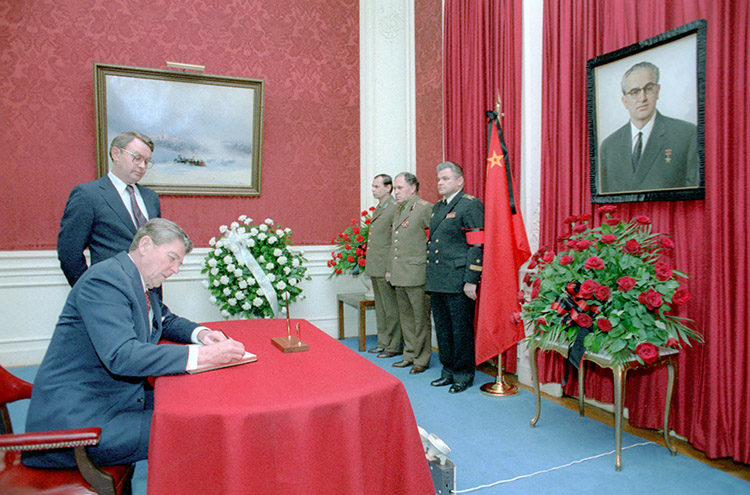
President Ronald Reagan at the Soviet Embassy in D.C., signing a condolence book shortly after the death of Andropov.

In February 1983, Andropov suffered total kidney failure. In August 1983, he entered Moscow's Central Clinical Hospital, where he would spend the rest of his life.

In late January 1984, Andropov's health deteriorated rapidly. Due to growing toxicity in his blood, he had periods of falling into unconsciousness. He died on 9 February 1984 at 16:50, aged 69. Few of the top Soviet leaders learned of his death on that day. According to the Soviet post-mortem medical report, Andropov suffered from several medical conditions: interstitial nephritis, nephrosclerosis, residual hypertension and diabetes, worsened by chronic kidney deficiency.

A four-day period of mourning across the USSR was announced. Syria declared seven days of mourning; Cuba declared four days of mourning; India, Iraq, Afghanistan, Ghana, Benin, and Brazil declared three days of mourning; Bulgaria, North Korea People's Republic of the Congo, and Zimbabwe declared two days of mourning; Czechoslovakia Yugoslavia, Sri Lanka and Costa Rica declared one day of mourning.

Andropov had a state funeral in Red Square, in a service attended by numerous foreign leaders, such as U.S. Vice President George H. W. Bush, British Prime Minister Margaret Thatcher, West German Chancellor Helmut Kohl, Italian President Sandro Pertini, East German First Secretary Erich Honecker, Polish First Secretary Wojciech Jaruzelski, Indian Prime Minister Indira Gandhi, Cuban President Fidel Castro, and Irish President Patrick Hillery. Eulogists were Chernenko, Ustinov, Gromyko, Georgi Markov (head of the Union of Soviet Writers), and Ivan Senkin (First Secretary of the Karelian Regional Committee of the CPSU). Andropov was buried in the Kremlin Wall Necropolis, in one of the 12 tombs between the Lenin Mausoleum and the Kremlin Wall.

Andropov was succeeded by Konstantin Chernenko, even though Andropov had wanted a younger Politburo member, Mikhail Gorbachev to succeed him. Andropov went as far as to add a paragraph to his report at a Central Committee plenum that did not meet until his death. However, he was ignored. In most respects, Chernenko seemed to mirror Andropov's tenure. Chernenko was already terminally ill when he ascended to the USSR's top spot, and served even less time in office (13 months). Similarly to Andropov, Chernenko spent much of his time hospitalized, and also died in office, in March 1985. Chernenko was succeeded by Gorbachev, who implemented perestroika and glasnost policies to reform the Soviet Union politically and economically. On 26 December 1991, the USSR was dissolved.

== Personal life ==
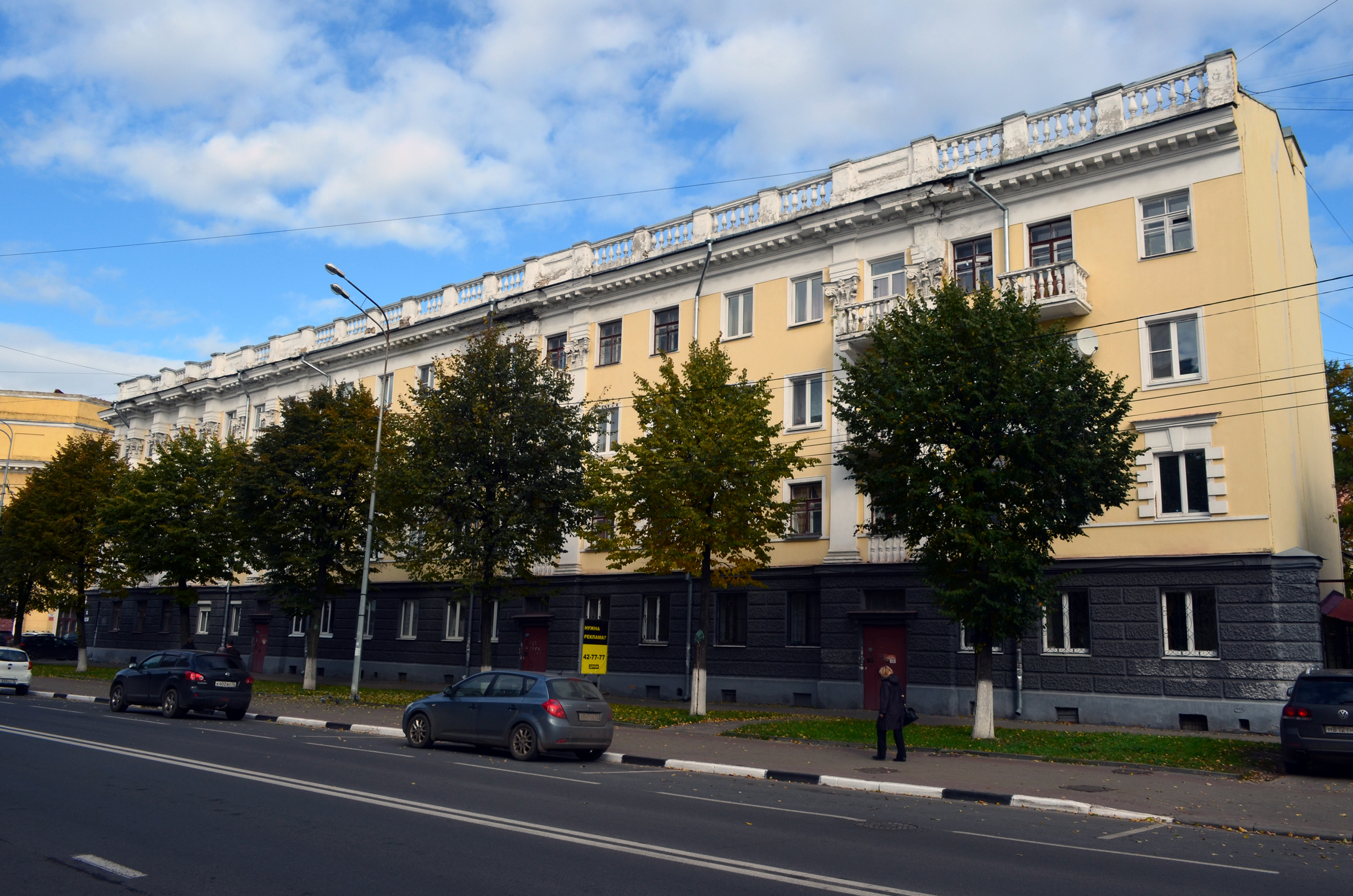
Andropov's House

Andropov lived at 26 Kutuzovsky Prospekt, the same building in which Suslov and Brezhnev lived. Andropov was additionally noted to have been significantly taller and larger than most of his contemporaries, remarked to have been over 6 ft 0 in (183 cm) tall.

He first married Nina Ivanovna around 1935; they had two children Evgenia (1936–2018) and Vladimir (1940–1975). Andropov later divorced Nina in 1941 and married his second wife Tatyana later that year. Vladimir eventually grew up to become a petty criminal and alcoholic much to his father's supposed embarrassment. Apparently when Vladimir was ill in a hospital, Andropov knowingly did not go to visit his dying son and also did not go to Vladimir's funeral upon his death in 1975 at the age of 35.

Tatyana and Andropov had two children, Igor and Irina. Igor joined the USSR Ministry of Foreign Affairs and served as ambassador to Greece.

== Legacy ==
Andropov's legacy remains the subject of much debate in Russia and elsewhere among scholars and in the popular media. He remains the focus of television documentaries and popular nonfiction, particularly at important anniversaries. As the head of the KGB for fifteen years, Andropov was ruthless against dissent, and author David Remnick, who covered the Soviet Union for The Washington Post in the 1980s, called him "profoundly corrupt, a beast".

Alexander Yakovlev, later an advisor to Gorbachev and the ideologist of perestroika, said: "In a way I always thought Andropov was the most dangerous of all of them, simply because he was smarter than the rest." But Andropov himself recalled Yakovlev back to high office in Moscow in 1983 after a ten-year exile as ambassador to Canada after attacking Russian chauvinism. Yakovlev was also a close colleague of Andropov associate KGB General Yevgeny Primakov, later Prime Minister of Russia. Andropov began to follow a trend of replacing elderly officials with considerably younger ones.

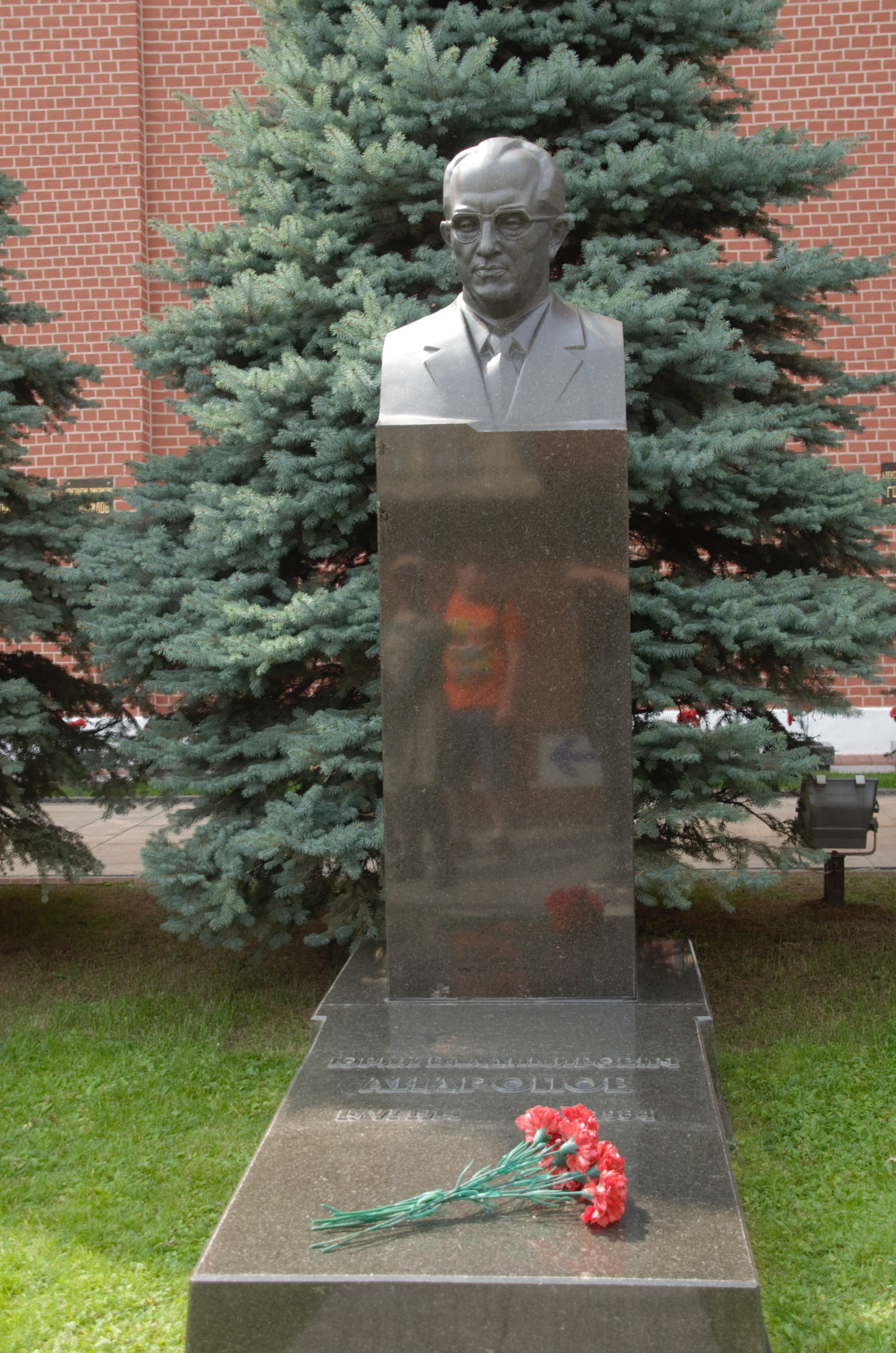
Andropov's grave at the Kremlin Wall Necropolis, Moscow.

According to his former subordinate Securitate general Ion Mihai Pacepa:

In the West, if Andropov is remembered at all, it is for his brutal suppression of political dissidence at home and for his role in planning the 1968 invasion of Czechoslovakia. By contrast, the leaders of the former Warsaw Pact intelligence community, when I was one of them, looked up to Andropov as the man who substituted the KGB for the Communist party in governing the Soviet Union, and who was the godfather of Russia's new era of deception operations aimed at improving the badly damaged image of Soviet rulers in the West.

Despite Andropov's hard-line stance in Hungary and the numerous banishments and intrigues for which he was responsible as head of the KGB, many commentators regard him as a reformer, especially in comparison with the stagnation and corruption of Brezhnev's later years. A "throwback to a tradition of Leninist asceticism", Andropov was appalled by the corruption of Brezhnev's regime, and ordered investigations and arrests of the most flagrant abusers. The investigations were so frightening that several members of Brezhnev's circle "shot, gassed or otherwise did away with themselves." He was generally regarded as inclined to more gradual and constructive reform than was Gorbachev; most of the speculation (Note: According to some experts, including political scientist Гавров, Сергей Назипович.) centers on whether Andropov would have reformed the USSR in a manner that did not result in its eventual dissolution like a "Russian Deng Xiaoping".

The Western media generally favored Andropov, but the short time he spent as leader, much of it in ill health, leaves debaters few concrete indications as to the nature of an extended rule. The 2002 Tom Clancy novel Red Rabbit focuses heavily on Andropov during his tenure of KGB chief, when his health was slightly better. It mirrors his secrecy in that British and American intelligence know little about him, not even able to confirm he was married. The novel also depicts Andropov as a fan of Marlboros and starka vodka, almost never available to ordinary Soviet citizens.

== Attitudes toward Andropov ==
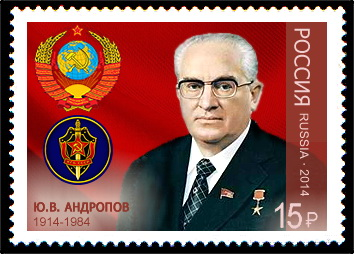
A 2014 postage stamp commemorating the 100th anniversary of his birth

=== Leadership persona and strategy ===
Various people who knew Andropov well, including Vladimir Medvedev, Aleksandr Chuchyalin, Vladimir Kryuchkov and Roy Medvedev, remembered him for his politeness, calmness, unselfishness, patience, intelligence and exceptionally sharp memory. According to Chuchyalin, while working at the Kremlin, Andropov would read about 600 pages a day and remember everything he read. Andropov read English literature and could communicate in Finnish, English and German.

Historian Moshe Lewin characterizes Andropov during his brief tenure as Soviet leader as "a politician interested in intellectual issues, but who was also a realist" and states that "Andropov was free of the habitual arrogance of Soviet leaders, who considered their empire invulnerable". This led him to seek dialogue with social democrats in Western countries instead of only building relationships with fellow Marxist-Leninists.

Within the party elites, he actively encouraged disagreements and debates, while also preserving the image of ideological unity towards the outside. Despite his KGB connections and his repressive tendencies, Andropov mused over ways to encourage "forms of political as well as economic pluralism". Vladislav Zubok even states that "The idea of renovating the Soviet Union originated not with Mikhail Gorbachev, but with his mentor Yuri Andropov", who was in favor of "controlled, conservative reforms".

=== Attitudes among dissidents ===
According to Russian historian Nikita Petrov, "He was a typical Soviet jailer who violated human rights. Andropov headed the organisation which persecuted the most remarkable people of our country." According to Petrov, it was a shame for the USSR that a persecutor of intelligentsia and of freedom of thought became leader of the country.

Roy Medvedev stated that the year that Andropov spent in power was memorable for increasing repression against dissidents. During most of his KGB career, Andropov crushed dissident movements, isolated people in psychiatric hospitals, imprisoned them, and deported them. According to political scientist Georgy Arbatov, Andropov is responsible for many injustices in the 1970s and early 1980s: deportations, political arrests, persecuting dissidents, the abuse of psychiatry, and notorious cases such as the persecution of academician Andrei Sakharov. According to Dmitri Volkogonov and Harold Shukman, Andropov approved the numerous trials of human rights activists such as Andrei Amalrik, Vladimir Bukovsky, Viacheslav Chornovil, Zviad Gamsakhurdia, Alexander Ginzburg, Natalya Gorbanevskaya, Petro Grigorenko, and Anatoly Sharansky.

According to Natalya Gorbanevskaya, after Andropov came to power the dissident movement went into decline, not on its own but because it was strangled. In the late 1970s and early 1980s, repression was most severe; many people were arrested a second time and sentenced to longer terms. The camp regime was not strict but specific, and when Andropov became General Secretary, he introduced an Article under which violations of camp regime resulted in a punishment cell and an additional term up to three years. For two or three remarks a person could be sent to another camp with non-political criminals. In those years, there were many deaths in camps from disease and lack of medical care.

=== Attitudes among Russian leaders ===
In a message read at the opening of a new exhibition dedicated to Andropov, Vladimir Putin called him "a man of talent with great abilities". Putin has praised Andropov's "honesty and uprightness".

== Honors and awards ==
Soviet Awards

Hero of Socialist Labor (14 June 1974)
Order of Lenin, four times (23 July 1957, 13 June 1964, 2 December 1971, 1–4 June 1974)
Order of the October Revolution (14 June 1979)
Order of the Red Banner (14 July 1944)
Order of the Red Banner of Labour, thrice (23 September 1944, 24 July 1944, 15 February 1961)
Medal "Partisan of the Patriotic War", 1st class (1943)
Medal "For the Victory over Germany in the Great Patriotic War 1941–1945" (1945)
Medal "For Valiant Labour in the Great Patriotic War 1941–1945" (1945)
Medal "For Distinction in Guarding the State Border of the USSR"
Jubilee Medal "Twenty Years of Victory in the Great Patriotic War 1941–1945" (1965)
Jubilee Medal "Thirty Years of Victory in the Great Patriotic War 1941–1945" (1975)
Jubilee Medal "In Commemoration of the 100th Anniversary of the Birth of Vladimir Ilyich Lenin" (1969)
Jubilee Medal "60 Years of the Armed Forces of the USSR" (1978)
Medal "In Commemoration of the 250th Anniversary of Leningrad" (1957)
Medal "In Commemoration of the 1500th Anniversary of Kiev" (1982)

- Honorary Member of the KGB, 1973

Foreign Awards

Order of the Sun of Liberty (Afghanistan)
Order of the Star (Afghanistan)
Hero of the People's Republic of Bulgaria (Bulgaria)
Order of the People's Republic of Bulgaria, 1st class (Bulgaria)
Order of Georgi Dimitrov (Bulgaria)
Medal "100 Years of Liberation from Ottoman Slavery" (Bulgaria)
Order of the White Lion, 1st class (Czechoslovakia)
Medal "For Strengthening Friendship in Arms", Golden class (Czechoslovakia)
Order of Karl Marx (East Germany)
Order of the Flag of the Republic of Hungary, 1st class (Hungary)
Order of Sukhbaatar (Mongolia)
Order of the Red Banner (Mongolia)
Jubilee Medal "50 Years Anniversary of the Mongolian Revolution" (Mongolia)
Military Merit Cross of Colonel Francisco Bolognesi (Peru)

== Speeches and works ==
- Ленинизм озаряет наш путь [Leninism illumes our way] (in Russian). Moscow: Издательство политической литературы. 1964.
- Ленинизм – наука и искусство революционного творчества [Leninism is science and art of revolutionary creativity] (in Russian). Moscow: Издательство политической литературы. 1976.
- Коммунистическая убежденность – великая сила строителей нового мира [Communist firm belief is a great power of builders of new world] (in Russian). Moscow: Издательство политической литературы. 1977.
- "Доклад на торжественном заседании по случаю столетия со дня рождения Ф.Э. Дзержинского" [The report at the solemn meeting on the occasion of the centenary of F.E. Dzerzhinsky's birth]. Izvestiya (in Russian). 10 October 1977.
- Шестьдесят лет СССР: доклад на совместном торжественном заседании Центрального Комитета КПСС, Верховного Совета СССР и Верховного Совета РСФСР, в Кремлевском Дворце съездов, 21 декабря 1982 года [The sixty years of the USSR: a report of a joint solemn meeting of the CPSU Central Committee, the USSR Supreme Soviet and the RSFSR Supreme Soviet in the Kremlin Palace of Congresses, 21 December 1982] (in Russian). Moscow: Издательство политической литературы. 1982.
- "Text of Andropov's speech at Brezhnev's funeral". The New York Times. 16 November 1982.
- Speeches and writings. Oxford; New York: Pergamon Press. 1983. ISBN 978-0080312873.
- Selected speeches and articles. Moscow: Progress Publishers. 1984. ASIN B003UHCKTO.
- Speeches, articles, interviews. A Selection. South Asia Books. 1984. ISBN 978-0836411652.
- Учение Карла Маркса и некоторые вопросы социалистического строительства в СССР [The teaching of Karl Marx and some issues of socialist building in the USSR] (in Russian). Moscow: Издательство политической литературы. 1983.
- Ленинизм – неисчерпаемый источник революционной энергии и творчества масс. Избранные речи и статьи [Leninism is an inexhaustible source of revolutionary energy and creativity of masses. Selected speeches and articles] (in Russian). Moscow: Издательство политической литературы. 1984.
- Andropov, Y.V. (1995). "The birth of samizdat". Index on Censorship. 24 (3): 62–63. doi:10.1080/03064229508535948. S2CID 146988437.
- Supreme Soviet - 16 June 1983. SUPREME SOVIET 1983 Full Version
- Speech against the use of atomic Bombs - c. December 1982.

== Notes ==
Government offices
Preceded by Vladimir Semichastny	Chairman of the State Committee for State Security; 1967–1982	Succeeded by Vitaly Fyodorchuk
Party political offices
Preceded by Leonid Brezhnev	General Secretary of the Communist Party of the Soviet Union; 1982–1984	Succeeded by Konstantin Chernenko
Political offices
Preceded by Vasili Kuznetsov	Chairman of the Presidium of the Supreme Soviet; 1983–1984	Succeeded by Vasili Kuznetsov
Awards and achievements
Preceded by The Computer	Time's Men of the Year (with Ronald Reagan); 1983	Succeeded by Peter Ueberroth
