= Karelian Regional Committee of the Communist Party of the Soviet Union =

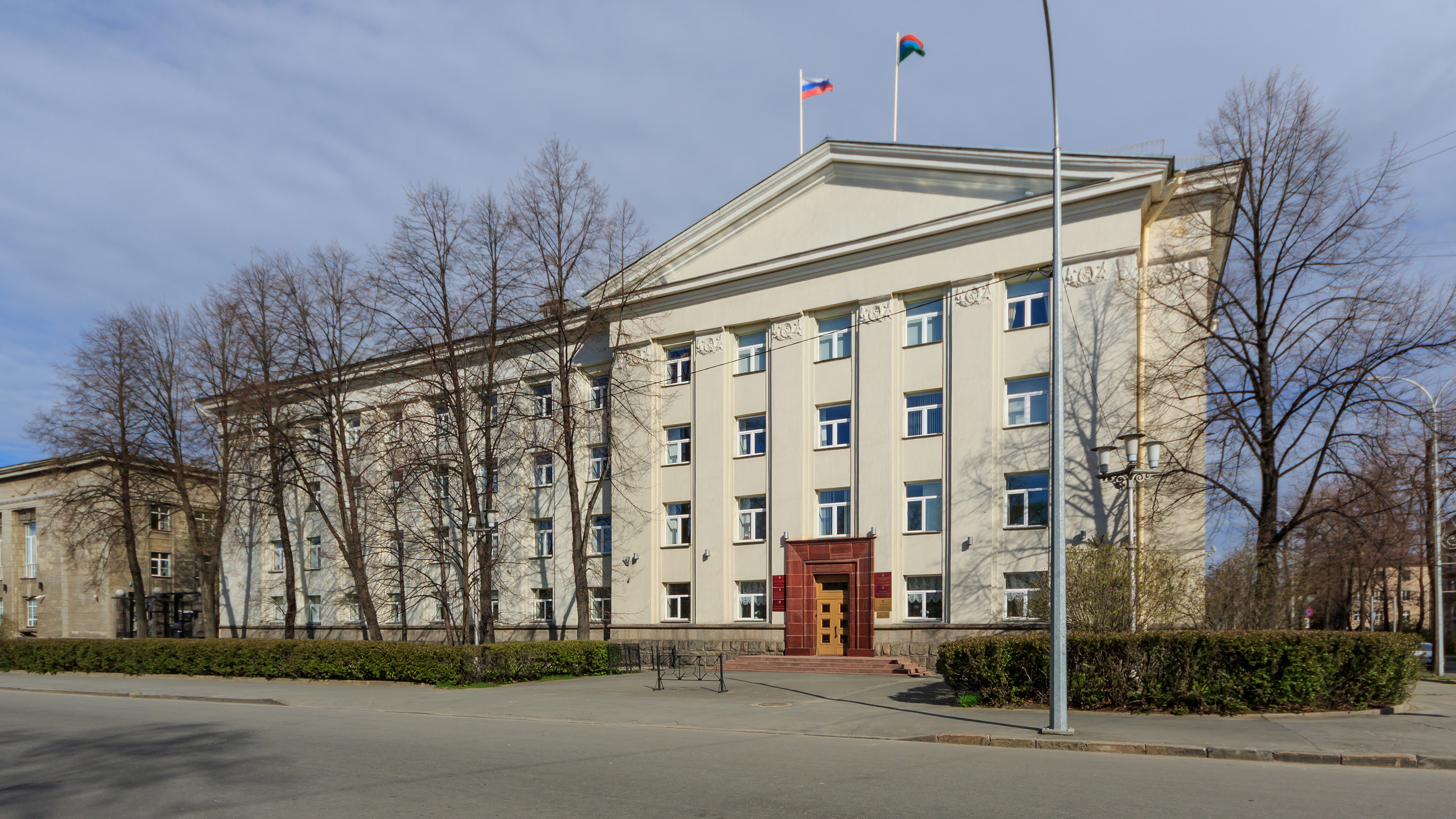
Building of Karelian Parliament in Petrozavodsk, Republic of Karelia (Russia)

The First Secretary of the Karelian regional branch of the Communist Party of the Soviet Union was the position of highest authority in the Karelian ASSR (1923–1940, 1956–1991) in the Russian SFSR, and in the Karelo-Finnish SSR (1940–1956) of the Soviet Union. The position was created in 1921, and abolished in August 1991. The First Secretary was a de facto appointed position usually by the Politburo or the General Secretary himself.

== List of First Secretaries of the Karelian Communist Party ==
Name	Term of Office		Life years
Name	Start	End	Life years
First Secretaries of the Communist Party (Note: Communist Party of the Karelo-Finnish Soviet Socialist Republic [KFCP] from March 31, 1940 to July 16, 1956)
Vasily Kudzhyev	1921	1922	1889–1976
Johan Järvisalo	1922	May 1929	1888–1929
Kustaa Rovio	June 19, 1929	August 21, 1935	1887–1938
Petr Irklis	August 21, 1935	July 25, 1937	1887–1937
Mihail Nikolsky (Note: Acting)	July 1937	September 1937	1902–1938
Nikolay Ivanov (Note: Acting)	September 1937	June 1938	1896–?
Gennady Kupriyanov (Note: In Russian SFSR exile 1941–1944)	June 1938	January 24, 1950	1905–1979
Aleksandr Kondakov	January 24, 1950	September 27, 1950	1908–1951
Aleksandr Yegorov	September 27, 1950	August 16, 1955	1904–1988
Leonid Lubennikov	August 16, 1955	September 1958	1910–1988
Ivan Senkin	September 1958	April 18, 1984	1915–1986
Vladimir Stepanov	April 18, 1984	November 30, 1989	1927–2022
Nikolay Kiryanov	November 30, 1989	August 1991	1940–

== See also ==
- Karelian Autonomous Soviet Socialist Republic
- Karelo-Finnish Soviet Socialist Republic

== Sources ==
- World Statesmen.org
