= Pavel Prokkonen =

Karelian Soviet politician (1909–1979)

Chairman of the Council of Ministers of the Karelo-Finnish SSR
- In office 1940–1947
- Succeeded by: Voldemar Virolainen
- In office 1950–1956
- Preceded by: Voldemar Virolainen
- Succeeded by: Ivan Stepanovich Belyayev

Chairman of the Presidium of the Supreme Soviet of the Karelian ASSR
- In office 16 July 1956 – 18 July 1979
- Preceded by: Otto Ville Kuusinen (SSR)
- Succeeded by: N. Kalinin

Personal details
- Born: Pavel Stepanovich Prokofiev; July 16, 1909 Klyushina Gora, Povenetsky Uyezd, Olonets Governorate, Russian Empire
- Died: July 18, 1979 (aged 70) Petrozavodsk, Karelian ASSR, RSFSR, Soviet Union
- Party: Communist Party of the Karelo-Finnish SSR, CPSU

Pavel Stepanovich Prokkonen (Russian: Па́вел Степа́нович Про́кконен; 16 July 1909 – 18 July 1979), born Prokofiev (Russian: Проко́фьев), was a Karelian Soviet politician. He was appointed as the Chairman of the Council of the People's Commissars of the Karelo-Finnish Soviet Socialist Republic (1940–1947) and Chairman of the Council of Ministers of the Karelo-Finnish Soviet Socialist Republic (1950–1956) ("prime minister" of the Republic). Prokkonen was also the Minister of Karelian Affairs for the Finnish Democratic Republic during the Winter War in 1940 (under the name Paavo Prokkonen)

After the Karelo-Finnish SSR was incorporated into the Russian SFSR as the Karelian Autonomous Soviet Socialist Republic in 1956, Prokkonen was the Chairman of the Presidium of the Supreme Soviet of the Karelian Autonomous Soviet Socialist Republic (1956–1979).

== Written works ==
- Geroizm naroda v dni voiny: Vospominaniia, (1974) D811.5 .P73 1974
