= Ryabenko =

Ryabenko, Russian, Ukrainian Рябенко, is a Slavic surname. Notable people with the surname include:

- Aleksandr Ryabenko, Soviet KGB general
- Konstantin Ryabenko (born 1983), Ukrainian ice hockey player
- Vasily Ryabenko (1934–2022), Soviet footballer
