= Yevstigneyev =

Yevstigneyev, also transliterated Evstigneev, is a Russian male surname. Its feminine counterpart is Yevstigneyeva. The surname is derived from the male given name Yevstigney and literally means Yevstigney's. It may refer to:

- Kirill A. Yevstigneyev (1917–1996), Russian fighter pilot
- Sergey Yevstigneyev (born 1974), Russian water polo player and coach
- Vitali Yevstigneyev (born 1985), Kazakh football player
- Yevgeniy Yevstigneyev (1926–1992), Soviet actor
