= Kuntsevo Cemetery =

Cemetery in Moscow

- Кунцевское кладбище
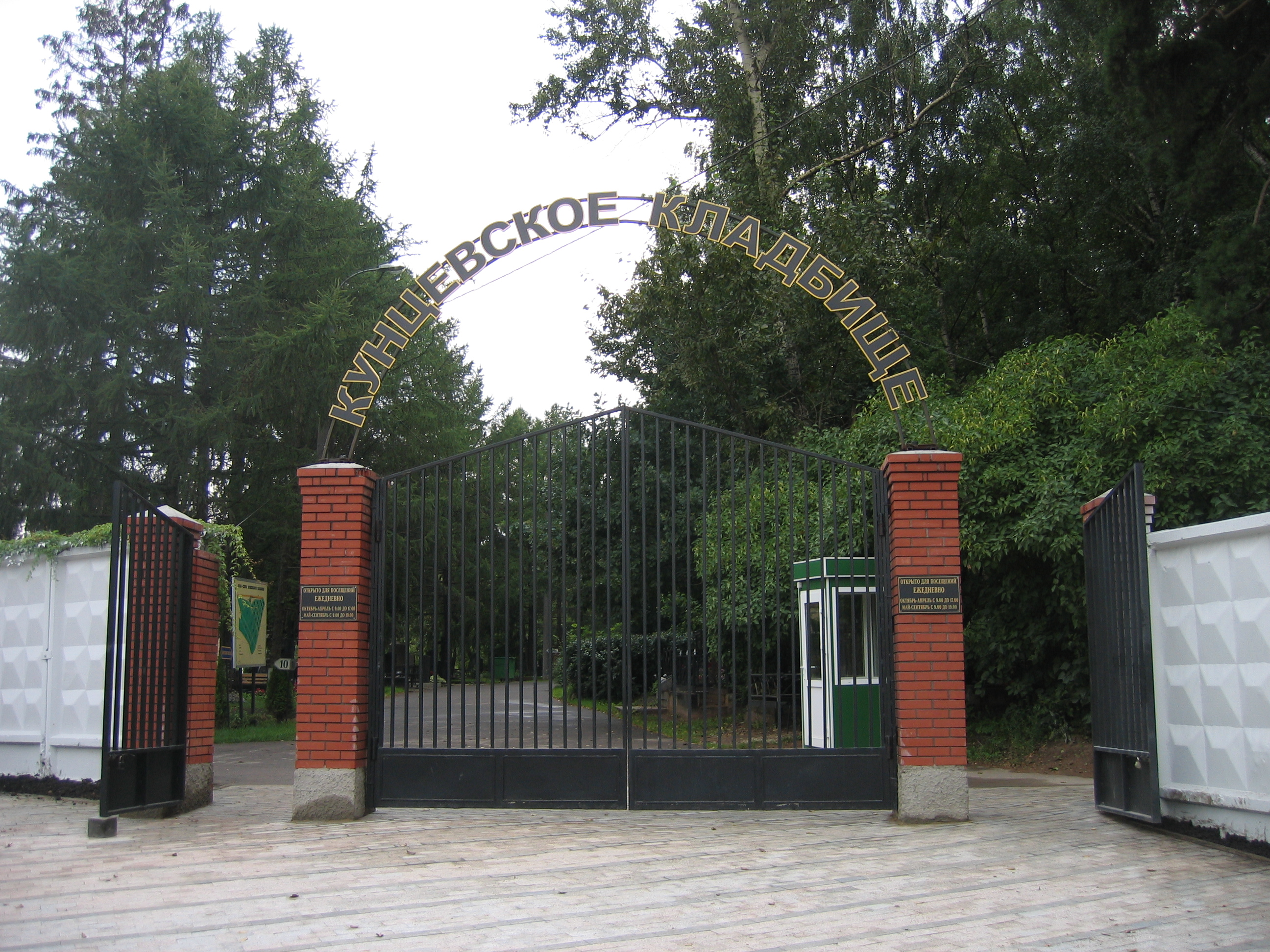
- Interactive map of Kuntsevo Cemetery

Details
- Established: 17th century
- Location: Moscow
- Country: Russia
- Coordinates: 55°42′28″N 37°25′00″E
- Size: 17 hectares (42 acres)

The Kuntsevo Cemetery (Russian: Ку́нцевское кла́дбище, romanized: Kúntsevkoye kládbishche) is a cemetery servicing Kuntsevo, Moscow. It is located on the bank of the Setun River, to the south of the Mozhaisk Highway (the continuation of the Kutuzovsky Prospekt). The local five-domed church was commissioned in 1673 by Artamon Matveyev. The cemetery is administered as part of the Novodevichy Cemetery complex.

== Interred ==
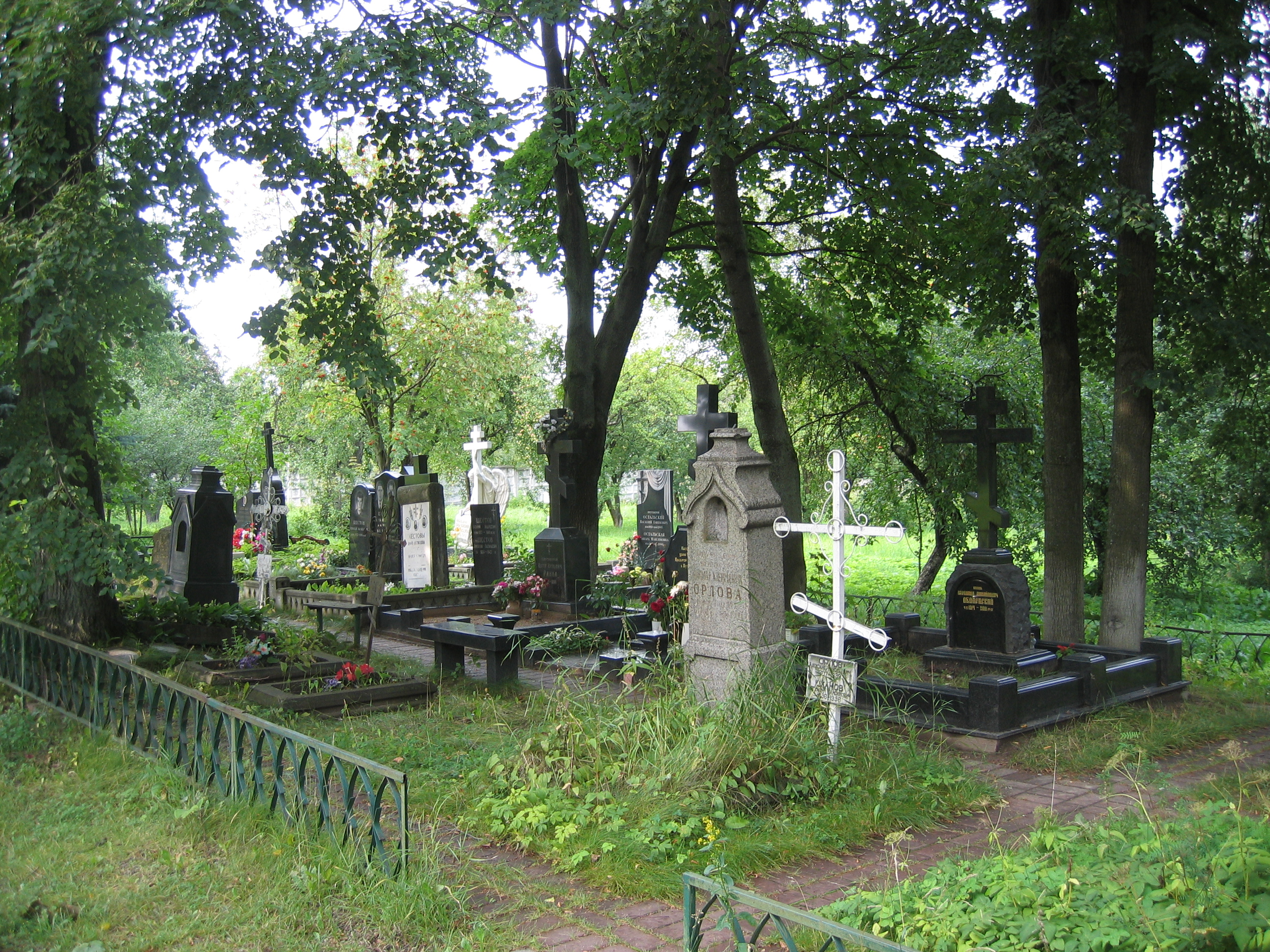
The 19th-century graves

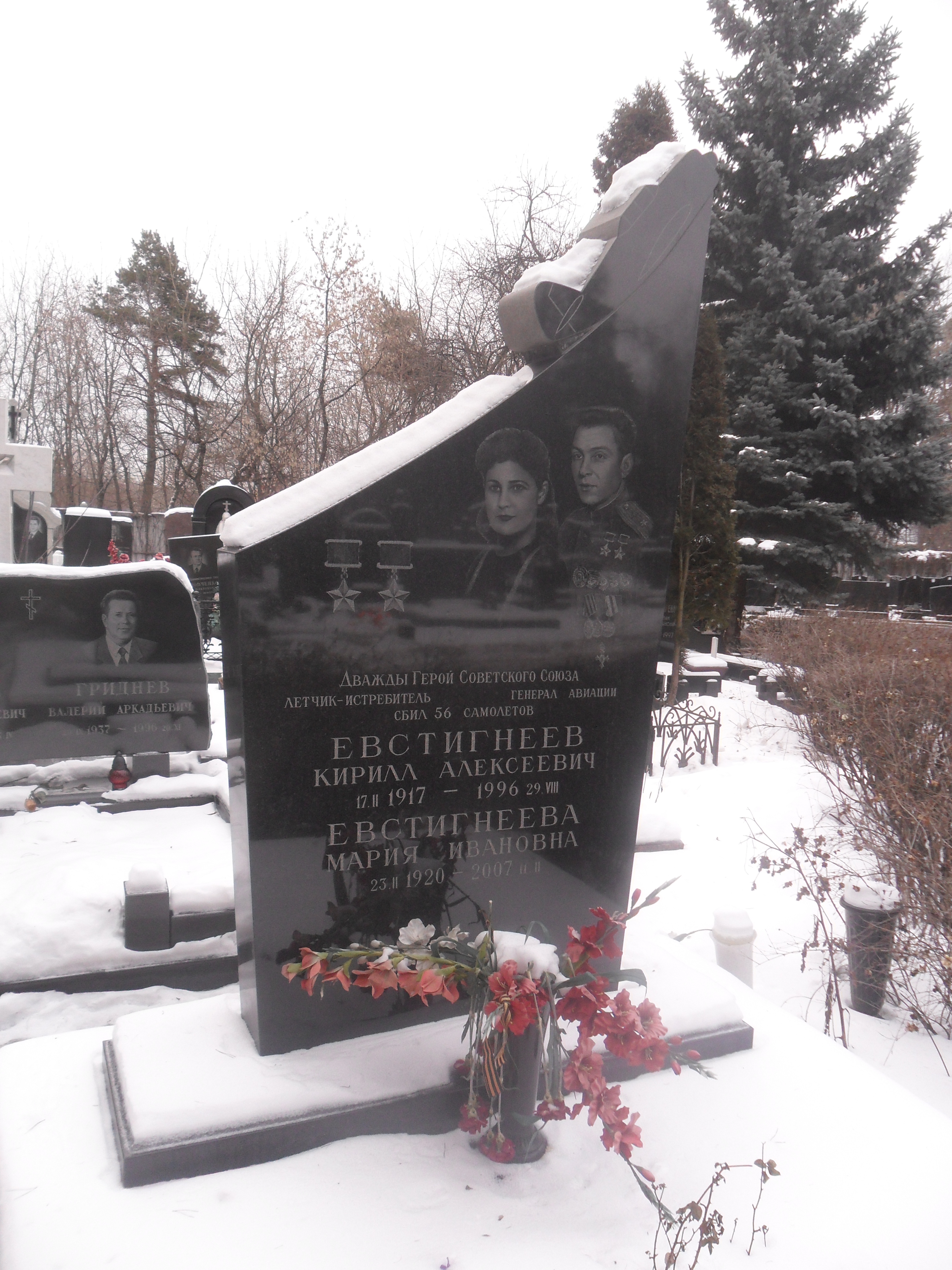
Tomb of Kirill A. Yevstigneyev

- Vsevolod Bobrov (1922–1979),
- Andrei Chabanenko (1909–1986), Soviet naval officer
- Lona Cohen (1913–1992), wife of Morris Cohen, spy
- Morris Cohen (1910–1995), spy
- Leonid Gaidai (1923–1993), film director
- Fedor Gusev (1905–1987)
- Tankho Israelov (1917–1981), dancer, choreographer, People's Artist of the USSR
- Valeri Kharlamov (1948–1981)
- Mamuka Kikaleishvili (1960–2000)
- Leonid Lubennikov (1910–1988), First Secretary of the Communist Party of the Karelo-Finnish Soviet Socialist Republic
- Trofim Lysenko (1898–1976)
- Georgy Malenkov (1902–1988), Premier of the Soviet Union
- Grigory Vasilyevich Romanov (1923–2008), First Secretary of the Leningrad Regional Committee of the Communist Party of the Soviet Union
- Nadezhda Mandelshtam (1899–1980)
- Ramón Mercader (1913–1978), assassin of Leon Trotsky
- Mark Naimark (1909–1978), Soviet mathematician
- Nikolay Nosov (1908-1976), author of children's literature
- Kim Philby (1912–1988), English-Soviet double agent
- Iskhak Razzakov (1910–1979), leader of the Communist Party of the Kyrgyz SSR, reburied at the Ala-Archa Cemetery, Bishkek in 2000
- Anatoly Rybakov (1911–1998)
- Artyom Sergeyev (1921–2008), adopted son of Stalin
- Varlam Shalamov (1907–1982), Russian poet and writer, Gulag survivor
- Larisa Shepitko (1938–1979)
- Lyubov Sokolova (1921–2001)
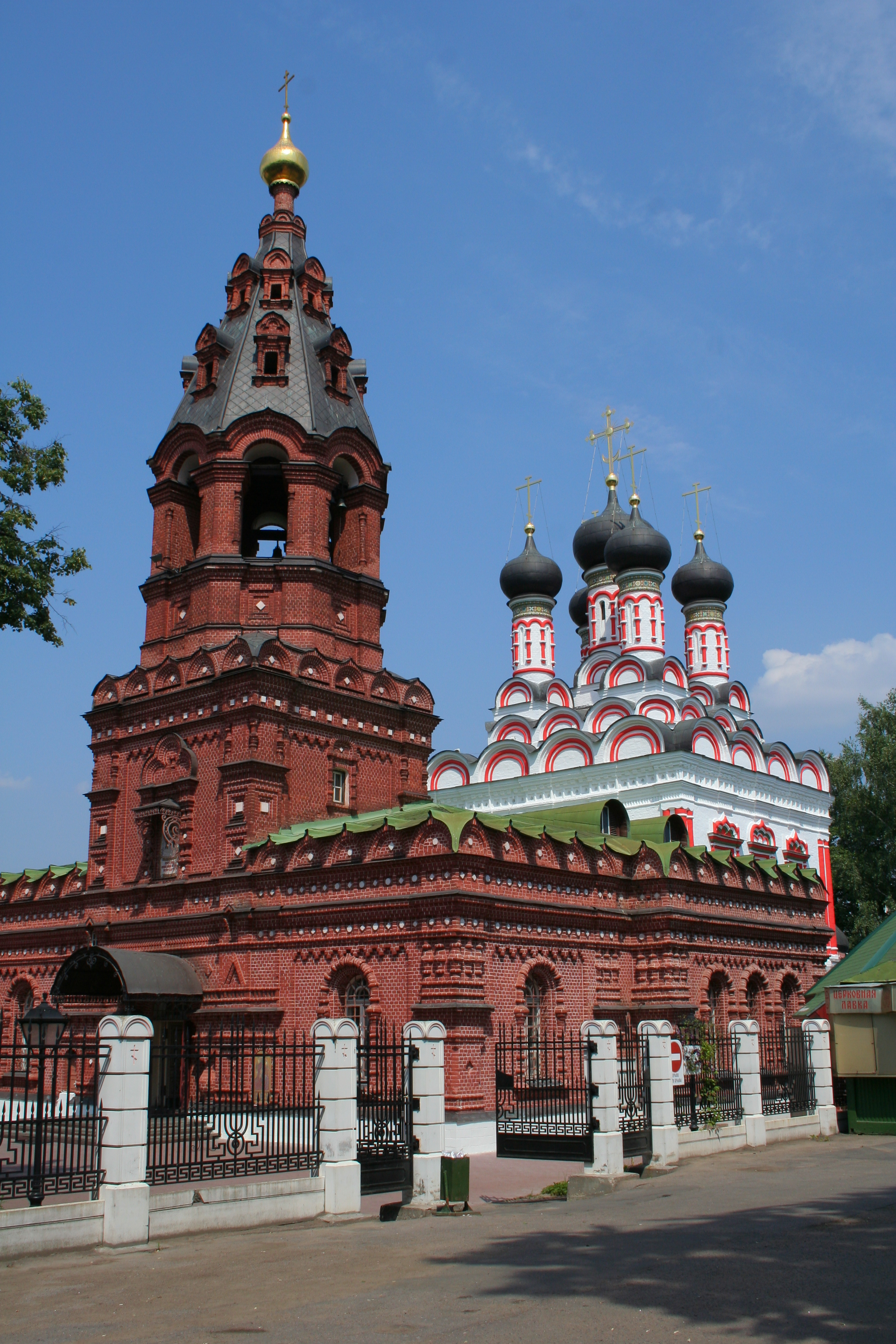
  A 17th-century church
- Glenn Michael Souther (aka Mikhail Yevgenyevich Orlov) (1957–1989), a spy inside the United States Navy who defected to Soviet Union
- Paul Tatum (1955–1996), American businessman murdered in Moscow
- Yuri Trifonov (1925–1981)
- Nikolai Vinogradov (1905–1979), Soviet naval officer
- Yuri Vizbor (1934–1984)
- Kirill A. Yevstigneyev (1917–1996), Major General
- Maxim Martsinkevich (1984–2020)
- Yevgeny Morgunov (1927–1999), actor
