= Gennady Kupriyanov =

Soviet politician

- Геннадий Куприянов

First Secretary of the Communist Party of the Karelo-Finnish Soviet Socialist Republic
- In office 2 April 1940 – 25 January 1950
- Preceded by: Office established
- Succeeded by: Aleksandr Kondakov

First Secretary of the Karelian Regional Committee of the Communist Party of the Soviet Union
- In office June 1938 – 24 January 1940
- Preceded by: Nikolay Ivanov
- Succeeded by: Aleksandr Kondakov

Personal details
- Born: Gennady Nikolayevich Kupriyanov; 21 November 1905 Rylo, Soligalichsky Uyezd, Kostroma Governorate, Russian Empire
- Died: 28 February 1979 (aged 73) Pushkin, Leningrad Oblast, RSFSR, Soviet Union
- Citizenship: Soviet Union; Russian Empire (previously)
- Party: CPSU
- Other political affiliations: CPKFSSR
- Spouse(s): Vera Vasilievna (div. 1950s); Lidia Ivanovna
- Children: 3
- Education: Candidate of Sciences
- Alma mater: Sverdlov Communist University
- Awards: Order of Lenin Order of the Red Banner Order of the Red Banner of Labour Order of the Patriotic War (1st class)

Military service
- Allegiance: Soviet Union
- Branch/service: Soviet Army
- Years of service: 1925–1927, 1939–1940
- Rank: Major general
- Battles/wars: World War II; Winter War

Gennady Nikolayevich Kupriyanov (Russian: Генна́дий Никола́евич Куприя́нов; 21 November 1905 – 28 February 1979) was a Soviet politician who served as the First Secretary of the Communist Party of the Karelo-Finnish Soviet Socialist Republic from 1940 to 1950.

== Early life and education ==
An ethnic Russian, Kupriyanov was born into a poor peasant family in the village of Rylo, Soligalichsky Uyezd, Kostroma Governorate, Russian Empire (present-day Soligalichsky District, Kostroma Oblast, Russian Federation) on November 21, 1905. He worked as a carpenter from the age of fourteen and continued working as a carpenter until he was twenty. He joined the All-Union Leninist Young Communist League (better known as the Komsomol) in 1920. He had three children with his first wife Vera Vasilievna; Victor (b. 1928), Rosa (b. 1929) and Galina (b. 1938). He attended the Sverdlov Communist University from 1932 to 1935.

== Political and military career ==
Kupriyanov served in the Red Army from 1925 to 1927. He also briefly served in the Soviet Army from 1939 to 1940 during the Winter War. With the outbreak of World War II, Kupriyanov joined the Military Council of the 7th Army on June 30, 1941. He also became a member of the Military Council of the Karelian Front on August 23, 1941. He was awarded the rank of Division commander on October 1, 1942. Not to long after, Kupriyanov was awarded the rank of Major general. After the liberation of the Karelo-Finnish Soviet Socialist Republic in 1944, a few members of the command of the Karelian Front (including General Terenty Shytkov) proposed to deport the indigenous population of the Karelo-Finnish SSR to Siberia and the Kazakh SSR and liquidate the republic. However the mass deportation of the Karelo-Finnish did not happen. Some historians credit Kupriyanov for preventing the mass deportation.

He joined the All-Union Communist Party (Bolsheviks) in 1926, but worked as a social science teacher at Solgalich Secondary School from 1927 to 1929. He became the Head of the Department of Public Education of the Solgalich District Executive Committee in 1929 and remained in the position until 1931. He served as the Head of the Department of Propaganda and Agitation of the Solgalich District Committee of the Communist Party from 1931 to 1932. After returning from university in 1935, Kupriyanov served as the Head of the School Department of the Dzerzhinsky District Committee of the Communist Party. He served as the First Secretary of the Kuybyshevsky District Committee of the Communist Party of the Soviet Union from 1937 to 1938 in Leningrad.

Kupriyanov was elected as the First Secretary of the Karelian Regional Committee of the Communist Party in June 1938 on the recommendation of Andrei Zhdanov to Stalin. As a regional committee's First Secretary, Kupriyanov became part of the NKVD troika in September 1938. He commenced a brutal purge to remove Finnish and Karelian personnel that saw at least 9,100 Finns sentenced to death, with estimates of the total death toll ranging as high as 30,000 or even 40,000 people.

During the Winter War, he ordered the construction of the 132 kilometer-long Petrozavodsk-Shuezersk railway; the railway was built in 46 days. With the formation of the Karelo-Finnish SSR in 1940, he became the First Secretary of the Communist Party of the Karelo-Finnish Soviet Socialist Republic on April 2, 1940. He was elected as a candidate member of the Central Committee of the All-Union Communist Party (Bolsheviks) during the 18th Party Congress. Gennady Kupriyanov and his family were evacuated to Novosibirsk in August 1941 due to World War II.

== Leningrad Affair ==
Kupriyanov soon became involved in the Leningrad Affair, he was accused of "failure to fulfill plans in industry and agriculture, patronage of workers who had compromised themselves, clampdown and lack of collegiality in work" by the Central Committee of the Communist Party of the Karelo-Finnish SSR. He was removed from his post as First Secretary of the Communist Party of the Karelo-Finnish SSR on January 25, 1950.

=== Arrest and Imprisonment ===
On March 15, 1950, Kupriyanov was arrested and transferred to Moscow. He was imprisoned in Lefortovo Prison two days later. In October 1950, the investigation regarding Kupriyanov was finished and he was sentenced to capital punishment. However, Kupriyanov's execution was postponed due to Stalin's rejection of Malenkov's demand for execution. On January 17, 1952, the Military Collegium of the Supreme Court of the USSR sentenced Kupriyanov to 25 years of forced labor with confiscation of all property under Article 58. He was soon sent to the Intalag, but his sentence was changed in July 1952 to imprisonment. On August 18, his sentence was changed to 10 years of imprisonment without confiscation of property. His wife, Vera Vasilievna was sentenced to imprisonment for "not informing the authorities about her husband's sabotage". Kupriyanov's eldest son and daughter were exiled to Taraz, Kazakh SSR. After the death of Joseph Stalin in the spring of 1953, Kupriyanov's family was allowed to return to Leningrad.

=== Rehabilitation ===
Kupriyanov was pardoned on January 18, 1956, by a decision of the Presidium of the Supreme Soviet of the Soviet Union. His criminal record was cleared as well. He was rehabilitated on July 31, 1957, which reinstated his Communist Party membership, his military rank of Major general, and his awards. He was also assigned a personal pension. He lived in Leningrad until his death in 1979.

== Death ==
Kupriyanov died on February 28, 1979. He is buried at the Kazan cemetery in Pushkin, Russia.

== Awards ==
- (Soviet Union) Order of Lenin (twice)
- (Soviet Union) Order of the Red Banner
- (Soviet Union) Order of the Red Banner of Labour
- (Soviet Union) Order of the Patriotic War (first class)

== See also ==
- Communist Party of the Karelo-Finnish Soviet Socialist Republic
- Winter War
