= Vasily Golubev =

Vasily Golubev may refer to:

- Vasily Golubev (painter) (1925–1985), Soviet, Russian painter
- Vasily Golubev (politician) (born 1957), governor of Rostov Oblast, Russia
