= Vasily Golubev (painter) =

Russian painter

- Born: Vasily Vasilievich Golubev; 15 June 1925; Medvezhye, Kostroma Governorate, Russian SFSR, USSR
- Died: 31 August 1985 (aged 60); Leningrad, USSR
- Education: Tavricheskaya Art School
- Known for: Painting
- Movement: Expressionism, Realism

Vasily Vasilievich Golubev (Russian: Василий Васильевич Голубев; 15 June 1925 – 31 August 1985) was a Soviet, Russian painter. He lived and worked in Leningrad, was a member of the Leningrad Union of Artists, as is regarded as a representative of the Leningrad school of painting.

== Biography ==
Golubev was born 15 June 1925 in the village of Medvezhye, Kostroma Governorate, USSR, into a peasant family.

In 1938 Golubev graduated from elementary school in town Soligalich and came to Leningrad, where he lived and worked since 1938. In 1941 he graduated from the Building college. After the beginning of the Great Patriotic War, Golubev volunteered for the Red Army. In January 1942 he was enrolled in flying school in Omsk, then studied at the Omsk tank school. Since March 1944 he served as a mechanic-driver 2-nd reserve tank regiment in Nizhny Tagil. In 1945 Golubev became seriously ill. He was treated at a hospital in Nizhniy Tagil, and then Leningrad. Later, he was discharged as a disabled veteran.

In 1948 Golubev entered the Tavricheskaya Art School where he studied at V. Petrova, G. Shakh, M. Shuvaev. In 1952 he graduated from Art School with the qualification of an artist and teacher of painting and drawing. After graduation, he lived to benefit disabled veterans and the funds received for the execution of paintings under contracts with the State Art Fund.

Since the end of the 1950s he was constantly involved in art exhibitions of Leningrad artists. He painted landscapes, still lifes, and genre compositions. He was most famous as a master of landscape. In 1966, Golubev was admitted to the Leningrad Union of Artists. A Solo exhibition of his works was in Leningrad (1991).

Golubev's painting style is original and individual, causing some association with the art of post-impressionism. Later, in the 1970s to 1980s, the latter style becomes more generalized and emotionally charged, expressionist, with elements of primitivism. Among his works are such paintings as "A Village of Putiatyno" (1957), [[:|"Horses"]] (1962), "Spring Rain", "Ladozhka River" (both 1963), "At the Fence", "A Summer" (both 1964), [[:|"A Winter Sketch"]] (1966), "Spring Brook" (1968), "Soldier's Family" (1969), "Light-Blue Day" (1971), "Golden Russia", "A Summer" (both 1972), "Geologists" (1976), "Green Spaces", "Autumn Harvest" (both 1977), [[:|"Green Lake"]], "Summer harvest", "In the Northern Land", "Light-Blue Spaces" (all 1980), and others.

Golubev died of heart disease on 31 August 1985 in Leningrad, aged 60. In 2005 in the U.S. was published the first monograph devoted to the work of Vasily Golubev. His paintings now reside in art museums and private collections in Russia, Finland, Germany, England, Japan, France, and the USA.

== See also ==
- Fine Art of Leningrad
- Leningrad School of Painting
- List of painters of Saint Petersburg Union of Artists
- List of the Russian Landscape painters
- Saint Petersburg Union of Artists

== Bibliography ==
- The Leningrad Fine Arts Exhibition. - Leningrad: Khudozhnik RSFSR, 1965. - p. 17.
- Exhibition of works by Leningrad artists dedicated to the 25th Anniversary of the Victory in Great Patriotic war. Catalogue. - Leningrad: Khudozhnik RSFSR, 1972. - p. 6.
- Across the Motherland Exhibition of Leningrad artists. Catalogue. - Leningrad: Khudozhnik RSFSR, 1974. - p. 12.
- Our Contemporary regional exhibition of Leningrad artists of 1975. Catalogue. - Leningrad: Khudozhnik RSFSR, 1980. - p. 14.
- The Portrait of Contemporary the Fifth Exhibition of works by Leningrad artists of 1976. Catalogue. - Leningrad: Khudozhnik RSFSR, 1983. - p. 8.
- The Fine Arts of Leningrad. Exhibition catalogue. - Leningrad: Khudozhnik RSFSR, 1976. - p. 17.
- Exhibition of works by Leningrad artists dedicated to the 60th Anniversary of October Revolution. Catalogue. - Leningrad: Khudozhnik RSFSR, 1982. - p. 13.
- Directory of members of the Union of Artists of USSR. Volume 1. - Moscow: Soviet artist, 1979. - p. 262.
- Regional Exhibition of works by Leningrad artists of 1980. Exhibition catalogue. - Leningrad: Khudozhnik RSFSR, 1983. - p. 12.
- Directory of members of the Leningrad branch of Union of Artists of Russian Federation. - Leningrad: Khudozhnik RSFSR, 1980. - p. 28.
- Exhibition of works by Vasily Vasilievich Golubev. Catalogue. - Leningrad: Khudozhnik RSFSR, 1991.
- Saint-Pétersbourg - Pont-Audemer. Dessins, Gravures, Sculptures et Tableaux du XX siècle du fonds de L' Union des Artistes de Saint-Pétersbourg. - Pont-Audemer: 1994. - p. 111.
- Matthew C. Bown. Dictionary of 20th Century Russian and Soviet Painters 1900-1980s. - London: Izomar, 1998. ISBN 0-9532061-0-6, ISBN 978-0-9532061-0-0.
- Vasily Golubev. Master Russian Expressionist. Dr. Alexander D. Borovsky, Dr. Albert Kostenevich, - The Pushkin Group, 2005. ISBN 0-9766949-0-5
- Sergei V. Ivanov. Unknown Socialist Realism. The Leningrad School. - Saint Petersburg: NP-Print Edition, 2007. – pp. 9, 21, 359, 394–400, 403–406, 445. ISBN 5-901724-21-6, ISBN 978-5-901724-21-7.
