= Leonid Lubennikov =

Soviet politician

- Леонид Лубенников

Deputy Chairman of the Board of the Central Union of Consumer Societies
- In office 1966–1981

Deputy of the Supreme Soviet of the Soviet Union
- In office 1954–1966

Member of the Central Committee of the Communist Party of the Soviet Union
- In office 1956–1966

First Secretary of the Kemerovo Regional Committee of the Communist Party of the Soviet Union
- In office 12 February 1960 – 23 December 1964

First Secretary of the Karelian Regional Committee of the Communist Party of the Soviet Union
- In office 25 July 1956 – September 1958

First Secretary of the Communist Party of the Karelo-Finnish Soviet Socialist Republic
- In office 16 August 1955 – 25 July 1956
- Preceded by: Aleksandr Egorov
- Succeeded by: Office abolished

Personal details
- Born: Leonid Ignatyevich Lubennikov; January 21, 1910 Forminovka, Yekaterinoslav Governorate, Russian Empire
- Died: November 28, 1988 (aged 78) Moscow, RSFSR, Soviet Union
- Citizenship: Soviet Union; Russian Empire (previously)
- Party: CPSU
- Spouse: Nina Dmitrievna Lubennikova
- Children: 3, including Ivan (b. 1951)
- Education: Novocherkassk Industrial and Agricultural College; All-Union Agro-Pedagogical Institute; Frunze Military Academy
- Awards: Order of Lenin Order of the Red Banner Order of the October Revolution Order of the Patriotic War (1st class) Order of the Red Banner of Labour

Leonid Ignatyevich Lubennikov (Russian: Леони́д Игна́тьевич Лубе́нников; 21 January 1910 – 28 November 1988) was a Soviet politician who served as the last First Secretary of the Communist Party of the Karelo-Finnish Soviet Socialist Republic from late 1955 to 1956. He was also the father of Russian painter Ivan Lubennikov.

== Early life and education ==
Lubennikov was born into a peasant family of Russian ethnicity in the village of Forminovka (now Antratsyt Raion), Yekaterinoslav Governorate, Russian Empire on January 21, 1910 (O.S. January 8, 1910). He graduated from the Novocherkassk Industrial and Agricultural College in 1930. He later graduated from the All Union Agro-Pedagogical Institute and the M.V. Frunze Military Academy in 1933 and 1944, respectively.

Before being admitted into the Communist Party of the Soviet Union in 1939, Lubennikov worked as teacher of tractor courses in the Ural region from December 1930 to April 1931. He was the Director of and a teacher at the Balandovskaya School of Combine Operators from 1933 to 1939.

== Political career ==
Lubennikov served as a propaganda instructor and Military Commissar of the Volga Military District from October 1939 to March 1944. From May 1944 to May 1946, he worked in the Brest region. From June 1946 to February 1949, he became a CPSU party organizer at a tractor plant in Minsk. He worked mostly with the Communist Party of Byelorussia between 1949 and 1953. He was elected as a candidate member of the Politburo of the Central Committee of the Communist Party of Byelorussia on February 14, 1954. He became the Inspector of the Central Committee of the Communist Party of the Soviet Union in August 1955. On August 16, 1955, Lubennikov became the First Secretary of the Communist Party of the Karelo-Finnish Soviet Socialist Republic and served until July 25, 1956, when the party was dissolved due to the liquidation of the Karelo-Finnish Soviet Socialist Republic. He succeeded himself as First Secretary of the Communist Party of the Karelo-Finnish Soviet Socialist Republic when he assumed the office of First Secretary of the Karelian Regional Committee of the Communist Party of the Soviet Union; he served in the position until September 1958. He served as the Head of the Department of the Industry of Consumer Goods and Food Products in the Central Committee of the Communist Party of the Soviet Union from September 1958 to February 1960. From February 12, 1960, to December 23, 1964, Lubennikov served as the First Secretary of the Kemerovo Regional Committee of the Communist Party of the Soviet Union. From December 1964 to 1965, he served as the Deputy Chairman of the Committee on Party and State Control of the Political Bureau of the Communist Party of the Soviet Union. From 1965 to 1966, he served as the Deputy Chairman of the Committee of People's Control of the Council of Ministers of the Russian Soviet Federative Socialist Republic. From 1966 until his retiring in 1981, he finally served as the deputy chairman of the Board of the Central Union of Consumer Societies.

He was elected a delegate to the 19th Congress of the Communist Party of the Soviet Union, the 20th Congress of the Communist Party of the Soviet Union, the 21st Congress of the Communist Party of the Soviet Union, and the 22nd Congress of the Communist Party of the Soviet Union. He was a member of the Central Committee of the Communist Party of the Soviet Union from 1956 to 1966. He was also a deputy of the Supreme Soviet of the Soviet Union from 1954 to 1966.

== Death ==
Leonid Lubennikov died on November 28, 1988, at the age of 78 in Moscow, Russian Soviet Federative Socialist Republic, Soviet Union. He was buried at the Kuntsevo Cemetery.

== Awards ==
- (Soviet Union) Order of Lenin (twice)
- (Soviet Union) Order of the Red Banner (twice)
- (Soviet Union) Order of the October Revolution
- (Soviet Union) Order of the Patriotic War (1st class)
- (Soviet Union) Order of the Red Banner of Labour (twice)

== See also ==
- Communist Party of the Karelo-Finnish Soviet Socialist Republic
