= Vladimir Sobachenkov =

Vladimir Sobachenkov (Russian: Владимир Собаченков) is a retired Soviet KGB officer who served as a bodyguard of Leonid Brezhnev.

On 23 March 1982, a platform with people collapsed above Brezhnev and his entourage at a factory near Tashkent. Sobachenkov was standing next to Brezhnev and managed to protect him from a direct hit. Brezhnev suffered a concussion and a broken clavicle, whereas part of the skin was removed from Sobachenkov's head. He was hospitalized, but rejoined Brezhnev's security team in an hour.

It was Sobachenkov and Vladimir Medvedev who found Brezhnev dead in his bed in the morning of 10 November 1982. After Brezhnev's death, his security team was disbanded. Sobachenkov was offered a low-profile position, but refused and retired from the KGB.

== Bibliography ==
- Medvedev, Vladimir (1994). Человек за спиной. Russlit. ISBN 5865080520.
