= Vladimir Stepanov (politician) =

Soviet diplomat and intelligence officer (1927–2022)

- Владимир Степанов

First Secretary of the Karelian Regional Committee of the Communist Party of the Soviet Union
- In office 18 April 1984 – 30 November 1989

Ambassador of the Soviet Union to Finland
- In office 27 December 1973 – 11 June 1979
- Preceded by: Viktor Maltsev
- Succeeded by: Vladimir Sobolev

Personal details
- Born: 21 March 1927 Kovgora, Kondopozhsky District, Karelian ASSR, Russian SFSR, Soviet Union
- Died: 14 June 2022 (aged 95) Moscow, Russia
- Awards: Order of Lenin; Order of the Red Banner; Grand Cross of the White Rose of Finland

Vladimir Sevastyanovich Stepanov (Russian: Владимир Севастьянович Степанов; 21 March 1927 – 14 June 2022) was a Soviet diplomat and intelligence officer. He served as ambassador to Finland from December 1973 to June 1979.

== Biography ==
Vladimir Stepanov was born in 1927 in Kovgora, Kondopozhsky District, to a Karelian family. He spoke Finnish with a strong Karelian accent. He graduated from the Moscow State Institute of International Relations in 1950. In 1952 he was elected secretary of the regional Central Committee of Komsomol in Karelia.

From 1963 he was on the staff of the Soviet embassy in Helsinki and was appointed ambassador ten years later. Stepanov was fired in 1979 after a controversial article was published in Pravda during the 1979 Finnish parliamentary election. The National Coalition Party was branded by the Soviet government newspaper as "unreliable" in foreign policy. This was considered interference in the internal affairs of Finland. Former Finnish foreign minister Keijo Korhonen named Stepanov the "worst enemy of Finland's neutrality".

After returning to the USSR, Stepanov was appointed first vice-premier of the Karelian Autonomous Soviet Socialist Republic. He was one of the initiators of the Soviet-Finnish Kostomuksha mine project in the north of Karelia. From 1984 Stepanov served as the first secretary of the Karelian Regional Committee of the Communist Party of the Soviet Union. In 1984 he was elected to the Supreme Soviet of the Soviet Union, and from 1986 to 1990 he was a member of the Central Committee of the Communist Party of the Soviet Union. After his retirement in 1989 he resided in Moscow.

Stepanov died on 14 June 2022 at the age of 95. He was buried in the Troyekurovskoye Cemetery on 17 June 2022.
