= Vladimir Medvedev =

Soviet general, intelligence official, bodyguard and lawyer

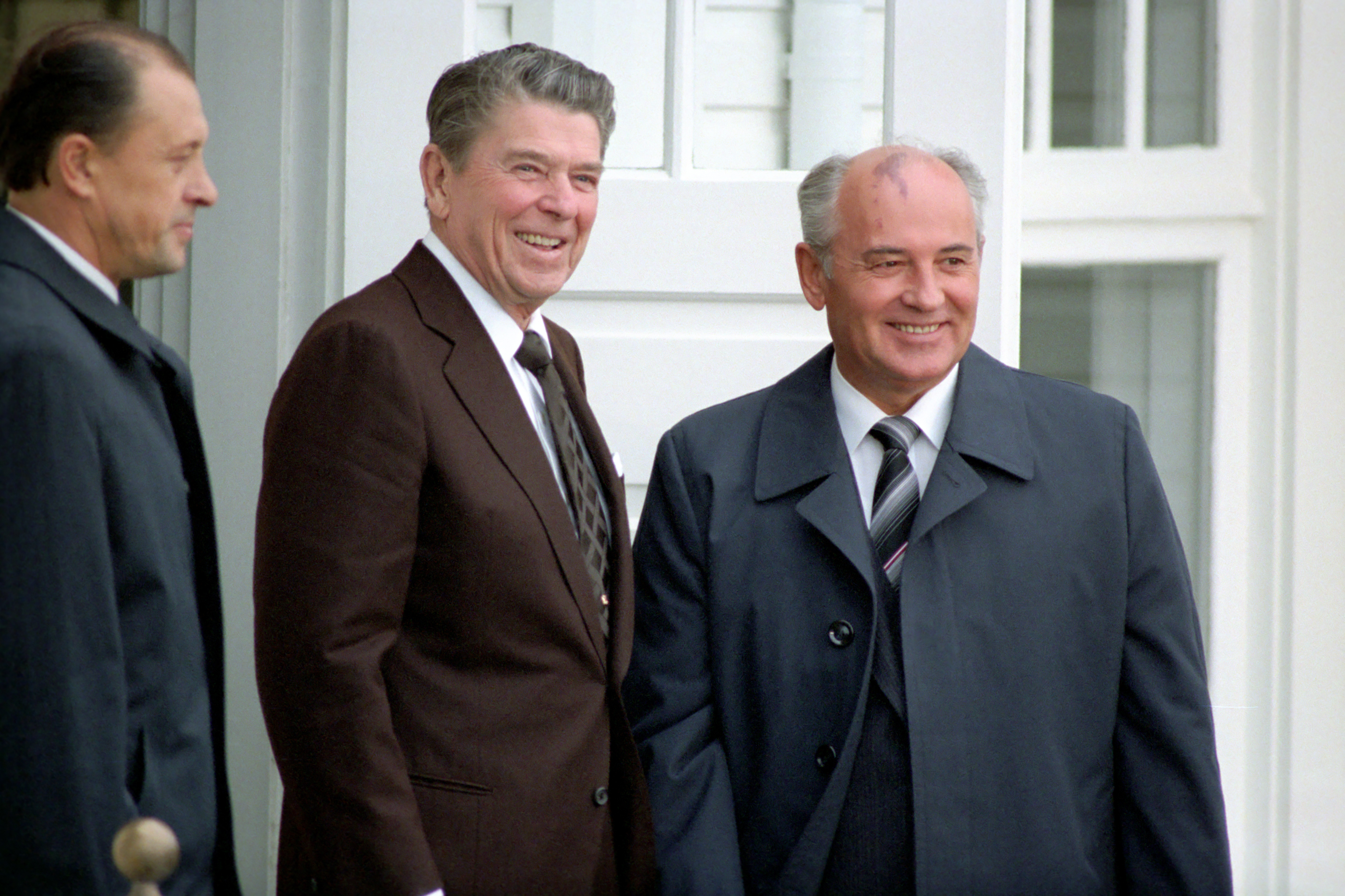
Medvedev (left), Reagan and Gorbachev during the Reykjavík Summit, 11 October 1986

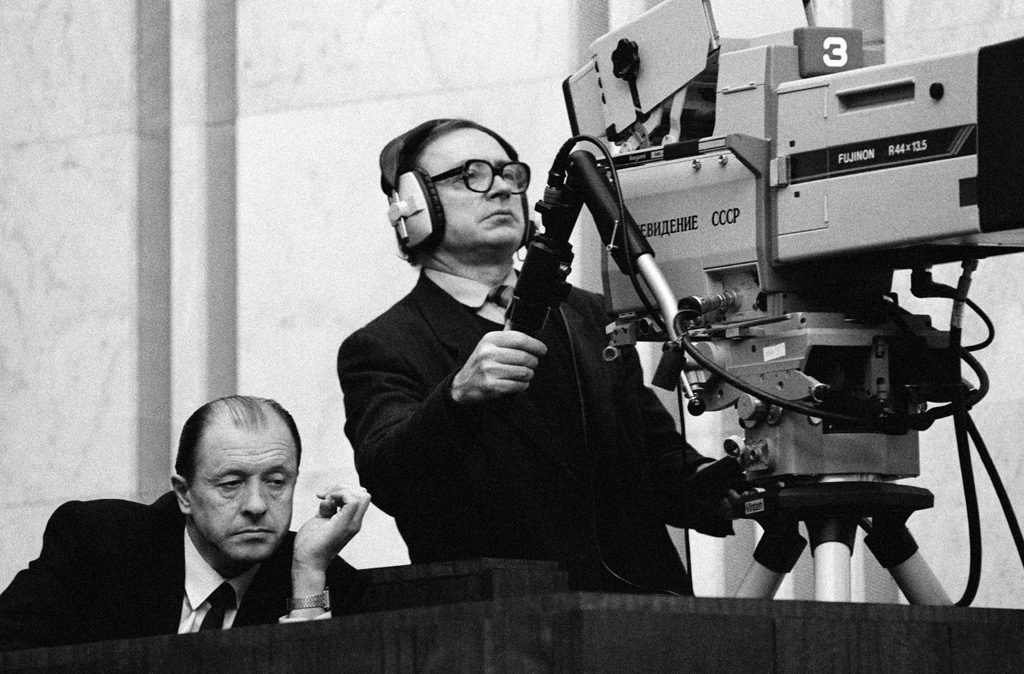
Medvedev (left) in 1990

Vladimir Timofeyevich Medvedev (Russian: Владимир Тимофеевич Медведев; born 22 August 1937) is a retired Soviet KGB general and bodyguard who was responsible for personal security of Soviet leaders including Leonid Brezhnev and Mikhail Gorbachev.

== Biography ==
Medvedev was born in village Popovo, Moscow Oblast into a family of four siblings. His father, Timofei Fyodorovich, was a carpenter and fought in World War II with an artillery unit, while his mother, Evdokiya Fyodorovna, worked at a factory and raised the children. In the late 1950s he served in the military as an aerial radio operator with the Baltic Air Force and then worked as a metalworker. In 1962 he was invited to train as a security officer with the KGB. He agreed mostly for financial reasons, as he was already married, and the new salary almost doubled that at a factory.

During the next five years Medvedev trained with the KGB, guarded a top-secret installation, and received a university degree in law by correspondence. His physical drills included close-range combat; extreme driving, diving and swimming; skiing, athletics, and shooting from various angles in a wide range of environments; he was also trained in first aid. In late 1967 he was promoted to the unit that was responsible for Brezhnev's security, and in 1972 became its deputy head, under Aleksandr Ryabenko. It was Medvedev and his colleague Vladimir Sobachenkov who found Brezhnev dead in his bed in the morning of 10 November 1982. Medvedev attempted CPR, but to no avail.

After the death of Brezhnev, only Medvedev kept a high-profile position among his closest bodyguards – the other three, Aleksandr Ryabenko, Vladimir Sobachenkov and Gennady Fedotov, were soon demoted and retired. Meanwhile, Medvedev was responsible for the security of top Soviet officials, including Heydar Aliyev and Mikhail Zimyanin, in their domestic and foreign trips. Yet his role was changed from supervising to actually organising security, i.e., personal field work. In the summer of 1984 he was ordered to accompany Raisa Gorbacheva in Bulgaria. This assignment was given to test whether Medvedev could work with her and her husband, who was seen by the KGB as the next Soviet leader. Medvedev passed the test and became head of Gorbachev's security. Gorbachev wanted to renew his entire security team with young KGB officers, yet he placed an experienced veteran as its lead.

During the 1991 Soviet coup d'état attempt, Yuri Plekhanov personally discharged Medvedev from Gorbachev's security. Medvedev obeyed a direct order from his superior and left Gorbachev in Crimea, for which Gorbachev never forgave him. In March 1992 Medvedev retired from the former KGB and later worked for a Russian firm providing security to foreign tourists. In 1994 he published his memoirs, The Man Behind the Back (Человек за спиной).

In his memoirs, Medvedev mentions that his wife Svetlana died in 1980, and that at the time of Brezhnev's death (1982) he was married to Dana and later had more than one daughter. Despite constant stress and overwork, he fell ill only twice during his KGB service, both times with a cold.

== Bibliography ==
- Medvedev, Vladimir (1994). Человек за спиной. Russlit. ISBN 5865080520.
