= Leninist Communist Youth League of the Karelo-Finnish Soviet Socialist Republic =

Leninist Communist Youth League of the Karelo-Finnish SSR (Karelian: Karjalas-suomelaisen sosialistisen nevvostotazavaldun Leninin kommunistinen nuorizoliitto, abbr. KSSNT:n LKNL or KSSNT:n Komsomol; Finnish: Karjalais-suomalaisen SNT:n Leninin kommunistinen nuorisoliitto, abbr. KSSNT:n LKNL or KSSNT:n Komsomol; Russian: Ленинский коммунистический союз молодежи Карело-Финской ССР, Leninsky kommunistichesky soyuz molodezhi Karelo-Finskoy SSR, abbr. LKSM KFSSR, Komsomol KFSSR) was the soviet republican branch of the All Union Leninist Communist Youth League (VLKSM, Komsomol) in the Karelo-Finnish SSR 1940–1956. The first congress of the Karelo-Finnish Komsomol was held 1st to 3rd June, 1940. The conference elected a Central Committee, with Yuri Andropov as its First Secretary (until 1944). During the Continuation War (part of WWII), the Central Committee of the Karelo-Finnish Komsomol organized partisan resistance against the Finnish occupying forces, both in urban and rural areas, but also mostly against civilians in Finland.

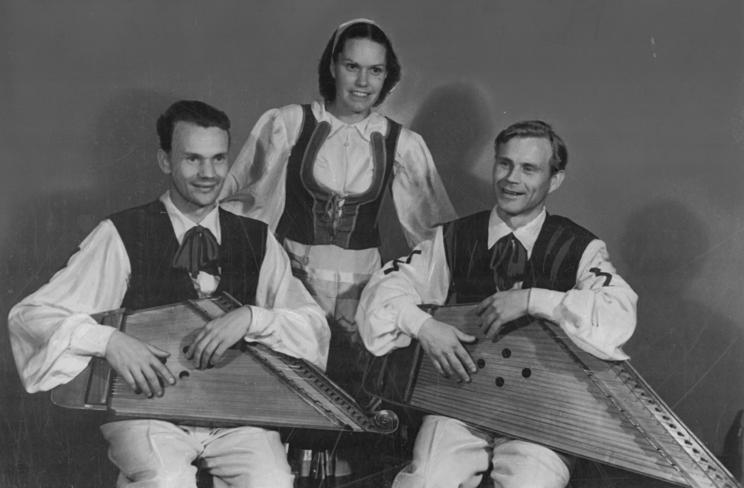
Karelo-Finnish Komsomol artists playing kantele at the 2nd World Festival of Youth and Students in Budapest, 1949

In total seven congresses of the Karelo-Finnish Komsomol were held. It published the newspaper Leninin nuori seuraaja/Юные ленинцы (Young Lenin's Follower) and Nuori bolsevikki/Молодой большевик (Young Bolshevik).
