= Kirill Yevstigneyev =

World War II Soviet fighter pilot

Kirill Alekseyevich Yevstigneyev
- Кирилл Алексеевич Евстигнеев
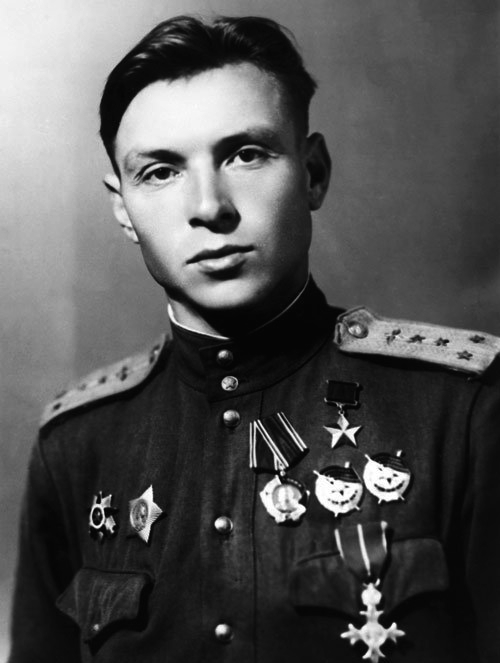
- Born: 17 February [O.S. 4 February] 1917; Khokhly, Orenburg Governorate, Russian Empire (located within present-day Shumikhinsky District, Russia)
- Died: 29 August 1996 (aged 79); Moscow, Russia
- Burial place: Kuntsevo Cemetery, Moscow
- Spouse: Mariya Ivanovna Razdorskaya
- Military career
- Allegiance: Soviet Union
- Branch: Soviet Air Force
- Service years: 1938—1972
- Rank: Major General (1966)
- Units: 240th Fighter Aviation Regiment; 178th Guards Fighter Aviation Regiment
- Commands: 178th Guards Fighter Aviation Regiment (1945)
- Conflicts: World War II
- Awards: Hero of the Soviet Union (twice)

Kirill Alekseyevich Yevstigneyev (Russian: Кирилл Алексеевич Евстигнеев; 17 February [O.S. 4 February] 1917 – 29 August 1996) was a Soviet fighter pilot and one of the top Soviet aces of World War II. During his career he claimed 53 solo and 3 shared aerial victories flying the Lavochkin La-5 and La-7 fighters.

== Early life ==
Yevstigneyev was born into a Russian peasant family on 17 February [O.S. 4 February] 1917 in the village of Khokhly, Chelyabinsky Uyezd, Orenburg Governorate, in what is now the Shumikhinsky District of Kurgan Oblast, in Russia's trans-Urals. He completed seven grades of schooling in 1935 before moving on to vocational school. He trained as a fitter-turner and upon graduation in 1936 moved to work at the Chelyabinsk Tractor Plant, where he joined the local aeroclub which he graduated from in 1938.

== Early military career ==
In September 1938 Yevstigneyev entered the Red Army. After completing initial training in 1939, he was stationed at a base in the Russian Far East until April 1940. In January 1941, he graduated from the Birm Military School of Pilots in the Amur region, after which he became a flight instructor on the I-16. In late October 1942 he was reassigned to Moscow to become acquainted with foreign-made fighters. While in Moscow, he and fellow sergeant Ivan Kozhedub came to the attention of I. S. Soldatenko, the commander of the 240th Fighter Aviation Regiment. Soldatenko selected them for his regiment in November, and by March 1943 they were deployed to the front.

== World War II combat service ==
On 28 March 1943, during his first dogfight, near the village of Urazovo in the Belgorod province, he shot down a Messerschmitt Bf 109 and gained shared shootdown of a Junkers Ju 88 after engaging a group of nine Ju 88.

On 5 August 1943, flying a close air-support sortie on the approach to Belgorod, Yestigneyev was shot down by friendly fire. After barely managing to parachute out of his burning plane he had to be taken to a field hospital due to the extent of wounds in both his feet. There he had to repeatedly dissuade surgeons from amputating his left foot, but ended up escaping after nine days and traveling 35 km to the nearest airfield on crutches. He found his way back to his airfield to finish his recovery there. Not long after being wounded and still on crutches, he flew his next combat sortie. That month he was appointed commander of the second squadron, and gained his tenth solo victory on 16 August 1943. Between March and November 1943, he completed 144 combat sorties, gaining 23 solo and three shared victories, for which he was nominated for the title Hero of the Soviet Union. He received it on the 2nd of August, 1944.

He was again awarded title on 23 February 1945 while he was a captain and squadron commander. In July 1944, the 240th Fighter Regiment was honored with the guards designation and renamed to the 178th Guards Fighter Aviation Regiment.

Yevstigneyev scored his last aerial victory on 26 March 1945 when he shot down an Fw 190 over Budapest. At the end of the war he was a Major; over the course of the war, he flew 283 combat missions, engaged in 119 dogfights, and gained 53 solo and three shared aerial victories. He flew in a variety of major battles including the ones for a Kursk, Kharkov, Belgorod, the Dnieper, Dresden, Budapest, Vienna, Bratislava, and Prague.

== Postwar ==
In 1949 he finished several Tactical Aviation Courses, and by 1955 served at the Military Aviation Academy. By 1960 he was on the Military Academy of General Staff. He then became Major General of aviation in 1966, from 1972 he served in the reserve. After retirement he lived in Moscow, where he died on 29 August 1996. He is buried at the Kuntsevskoe cemetery in Moscow. A bronze bust of him stands in Shumikha, Kurgan province, near the village of his birth.

== Awards and decorations ==
- Twice Hero of the Soviet Union (2 August 1944 and 23 February 1945)
- Order of Lenin (2 August 1944)
- Four Order of the Red Banner (11 October 1943, 26 October 1943, 22 February 1945, and 22 February 1968)
- Order of Suvorov 3rd class (2 October 1943)
- Order of the Patriotic War 1st class (11 March 1985)
- Order of the Patriotic War 2nd class (30 April 1943)
- Order of the Red Star (3 November 1953)
- Order of the British Empire (1943)
- campaign and commemorative medals
