= Communist Party of the Karelo-Finnish Soviet Socialist Republic =

Communist Party of the Karelo-Finnish Soviet Socialist Republic Karjalais-suomalaisen sosialistisen neuvostotasavallan kommunistinen puolue
- First Secretary: Gennady Kupriyanov (first); Leonid Lubennikov (last)
- Standing Committee: Karelian Regional Committee of the Communist Party of the Soviet Union
- Founded: 2 April 1940
- Dissolved: 25 July 1956
- Merged into: Communist Party of the Soviet Union (CPSU)
- Ideology: Communism; Marxism–Leninism
- Political position: Far-left
- National affiliation: CPSU

Party flag

The Communist Party of the Karelo-Finnish SSR (Russian: Коммунистическая партия Карело-Финской Советской Социалистической Республики, romanized: Kommunistcheskaya partiya Karelo-Finskoy Sovyetskoy Sotsialisticheskoy Respubliki, Finnish: Karjalais-suomalaisen sosialistisen neuvostotasavallan kommunistinen puolue), initially known as the Communist Party (Bolshevik) of the Karelo-Finnish SSR, was the branch of the All-Union Communist Party/Communist Party of the Soviet Union in the Karelo-Finnish SSR (1940–1956).

== First Secretaries of the Party ==
| No. | Picture | Name (Birth–Death) | Took office | Left office | Time in office |
First Secretary
| 1 | | Gennady Kupriyanov (1905–1979) | 2 April 1940 | 25 January 1950 | 9 years, 298 days |
| 2 | | Aleksandr Kondakov (1908–1954) | 25 January 1950 | 27 September 1950 | 245 days |
| 3 | | Aleksandr Egorov (1904–1988) | 27 September 1950 | 16 August 1955 | 4 years, 323 days |
| 4 | | Leonid Lubennikov (1910–1988) | 16 August 1955 | 25 July 1956 | 344 days |

== Second Secretaries of the Party ==
Yuri Andropov was elected Second Secretary of the Central Committee in 1947.

== See also ==
- Leninist Communist Youth League of the Karelo-Finnish SSR
