= Aleksandr Ryabenko =

Soviet KGB general

Ryabenko (left) and Brezhnev in the 1970s

Aleksandr Yakovlevich Ryabenko (Russian: Александр Яковлевич Рябенко, 25 August 1915 – March 1993) was a Soviet KGB general who was responsible for personal security of Leonid Brezhnev.

== Biography ==
Ryabenko graduated from a road transport college. He first met Brezhnev in 1938, when he was assigned as his personal driver. They split up during World War II, in which Ryabenko fought as paratrooper while Brezhnev served as political commissar. After the war, Ryabenko became Brezhnev's close friend and head of his security.

In 1956, when Brezhnev decided to examine a uranium mine shaft, the visitors had a shortage of protective suits. Ryabenko wore none and received a high dose of radiation. On 24 October 1960 he got exposed to the toxic chemical unsymmetrical dimethylhydrazine, shortly after the Nedelin catastrophe, in which a ballistic rocket exploded on the launch pad. As a result, Ryabenko was hospitalized for two months with a heart attack. On 9 February 1961 he was with Brezhnev when their plane was attacked by hijacked French jet fighters above the Mediterranean Sea. On 23 March 1982, a platform with people collapsed above Brezhnev and his entourage at a factory near Tashkent. Both Brezhnev and Ryabenko received concussions.

After Brezhnev's death in 1982 Ryabenko supervised security of dachas of Soviet leaders. He retired in 1987 and died in March 1993, aged 77.

Ryabenko married shortly after World War II, to Lilya, his fiancee from 1940. They had two sons, elder Vadim (born before 1946) and younger Yury.

== Bibliography ==
- Medvedev, Vladimir (1994). Человек за спиной. Russlit. ISBN 5865080520.
