= Aleksandr Kondakov =

Soviet politician

- Александр Кондаков

First Secretary of the Communist Party of the Karelo-Finnish Soviet Socialist Republic
- In office 25 January 1950 – 27 September 1950
- Preceded by: Gennady Kupriyanov
- Succeeded by: Aleksandr Egorov

First Secretary of the Kostroma Regional Committee of the Communist Party of the Soviet Union
- In office 13 August 1944 – 4 December 1946
- Preceded by: Office established
- Succeeded by: Ivan Kuznetsov

Personal details
- Born: Aleksandr Andreyevich Kondakov; 5 May 1908 Vladimir Governorate, Russian Empire
- Died: 20 December 1954 (aged 46) Moscow, RSFSR, Soviet Union
- Citizenship: Soviet Union
- Party: CPSU
- Education: Higher Party School of the CPSU
- Occupation: Politician
- Awards: Order of the Patriotic War (1st class) Order of the Badge of Honour

Aleksandr Andreyevich Kondakov (Russian: Алекса́ндр Андре́евич Кондако́в; 5 May 1908 – 20 December 1954) was a Soviet politician who served as the First Secretary of the Communist Party of the Karelo-Finnish Soviet Socialist Republic in 1950.

== Early life and education ==
An ethnic Russian, Kondakov was born into a peasant family on 5 May 1908 in the village of Maidakovo, Vladimir Governorate, Russian Empire. Kondakov worked as an electrician until 1929 and also worked as a Secretary of the Komsomol branch in the Ivanovo-Voznesensk area. He graduated from the Higher Party School of the Communist Party of the Soviet Union in 1948.

== Political career ==
Kondakov joined the Communist Party of the Soviet Union in 1928. He worked in his first major position from October 1937 to 1938, as Chairman of the Executive Committee of the Yaroslavl Regional Council. From 13 August 1944 to 4 December 1946, Kondakov served as the First Secretary of the Kostroma Regional Committee of the Communist Party of the Soviet Union. He was relieved from his position by the Politburo due to "the lack of necessary general education and the existing shortcomings in work". After graduating from the Higher Party School in 1948, he served as the Inspector of the Central Committee of the Communist Party of the Soviet Union from 1949 to January 1950. Kondakov then served as the First Secretary of the Communist Party of the Karelo-Finnish Soviet Socialist Republic from 25 January 1950 to 27 September 1950. He retired in 1950 for health reasons.

== Death ==
Kondakov died on 20 December 1954 at the age of 46 in Moscow, RSFSR, Soviet Union. He was buried at the Novodevichy Cemetery located in Moscow.

== Awards ==
- (Soviet Union) Order of the Patriotic War (1st Class)
- (Soviet Union) Order of the Red Star
- (Soviet Union) Order of the Badge of Honour
- (Soviet Union) Medal "For the Defence of Leningrad"

== See also ==
- Communist Party of the Karelo-Finnish Soviet Socialist Republic
