= Soligalichsky Uyezd =

Subdivision of the Russian Empire

Soligalichsky Uyezd (Солигаличский уезд) was one of the subdivisions of the Kostroma Governorate of the Russian Empire. It was situated in the northwestern part of the governorate. Its administrative centre was Soligalich.

== Demographics ==
At the time of the Russian Empire Census of 1897, Soligalichsky Uyezd had a population of 62,543. Of these, 99.9% spoke Russian as their native language.
