= Deaths in April 1979 =

The following is a list of notable deaths in April 1979. Entries for each day are listed alphabetically by surname. A typical entry lists information in the following sequence:

- Name, age, country of citizenship at birth, subsequent country of citizenship (if applicable), reason for notability, cause of death (if known), and reference.

== April 1979 ==
=== 1 ===
- Red Burnett, 68, Canadian sports journalist, heart attack.
- Bill Cope, 79, English footballer.
- Bruno Coquatrix, 68, French record producer and politician.
- Abdelhalim Hemche, 71, Algerian painter.
- Gennady Komnatov, 29, Soviet Olympic racing cyclist (1972), traffic collision.
- Barbara Luddy, 70, American actress (Lady and the Tramp, Sleeping Beauty, Winnie the Pooh), lung cancer.
- Rinus Peijnenburg, 51, Dutch politician.
- Jack Pepper, 76, American actor and vaudeville comedian.
- Reuben W. Peterson, 79, American politician, member of the Wisconsin State Assembly (1935–1939).
- Ragnar Stoud Platou, 81, Norwegian shipbroker.

=== 2 ===
- George Andreani, 78, Polish-Argentine composer.
- Billy Austin, 78, English footballer.
- Ivan Barrow, 68, Jamaican cricketer.
- Sir Alfred Broughton, 76, British politician, MP (since 1949).
- Devasahayam David Chelliah, 85, Indian-born Singaporean Anglican prelate.
- Frank H. Davis, 68, American businessman and public official.
- Richard Ettinghausen, 73, German-American art historian, cancer.
- Erich Rademacher, 77, German Olympic water polo player (1928, 1932).
- Carroll Rosenbloom, 72, American football executive, drowned.
- Józef Sobota, 76, Polish footballer.
- Ellen Margrethe Stein, 85, Danish actress.
- Florence Stephens, 97, Swedish socialite.

=== 3 ===
- Alexander Andrae, 90, German general and Nazi government official.
- Juan Cedrés, 51, Spanish footballer.
- Max Conrad, 76, American aviator.
- Joe Cooper, 64, Canadian ice hockey player.
- José Echavarría, 95, Chilean politician.
- Ernst Glaser, 75, German-Norwegian violinist.
- Syed Mahbub Murshed, 68, Bangladeshi jurist.
- Alexandre Orloff, 80, Russian-French painter.
- Gordon Parks Jr., 44, American film director (Super Fly), plane crash.
- Arthur Phoenix, 77, English footballer.
- Amelia Piccinini, 62, Italian Olympic shot putter (1948).
- Jock Shearer, 61, Scottish football player and manager.
- Harry Simpson, 53, American baseball player, heart attack.
- Andy Spiva, 24, American football player, traffic collision.
- Dagfinn Zwilgmeyer, 78, Norwegian Lutheran priest and psalmist.

=== 4 ===
- Robert Allan, Baron Allan of Kilmahew, 64, British politician, MP (1951–1966).
- Vicente Asencio, 70, Spanish composer.
- Carleton Beals, 85, American journalist.
- Zulfikar Ali Bhutto, 51, Pakistani politician, president (1971–1973) and prime minister (1973–1977), execution by hanging.
- Edgar Buchanan, 76, American actor (Petticoat Junction), stroke.
- Beatriz Escalona, 75, American actress.
- Jakob Nielsen, 78, Danish actor.
- Rolf Örn, 86, Swedish Olympic equestrian (1936).
- Valentina Ramírez Avitia, 86, Mexican revolutionary, house fire.
- Federico Reparez, 79, Spanish Olympic runner (1920).
- Inez Robb, 78, American journalist, complications from Parkinson's disease.
- Joseph Irenée Rochefort, 68, Canadian politician, MP (1949–1958).
- Philippe Stern, 83, French art historian.
- Hans Stormoen, 72, Norwegian actor.
- Alex Wood, 70, Scottish-born Canadian-American ice hockey player.
- Leonora Wray, 92, Australian golfer.

=== 5 ===
- Louis Bottino, 71, American politician, member of the Illinois House of Representatives (1957–1961).
- Eugène Gabritschevsky, 85, Russian-French artist and biologist.
- John A. Hartle, 87, American politician, member of the Minnesota House of Representatives (1935–1969).
- Lee In, 82, South Korean politician.
- John Petty, 60, American football player.
- Whitney Straight, 66, British racing driver, aviator and businessman.
- Arthur Willis, 85, English Olympic high jumper (1924).

=== 6 ===
- David Armitage Bannerman, 92, British ornithologist and museum curator.
- Frank Coughlan, 74, Australian jazz musician and bandleader.
- Jean Degouve, 89, French footballer.
- Al Evans, 62, American baseball player and manager.
- Janey Ironside, 59–60, British fashion designer and academic.
- Rudy Kallio, 86, American baseball player.
- Solomon Mahlangu, 22, South African revolutionary, execution by hanging.
- Louis Marcien Marion, 72, Canadian politician.
- Finn Øen, 76, Norwegian politician and businessman.
- Peter Penny, 2nd Viscount Marchwood, 66, British hereditary peer.
- Jean Perera Sinnappa, 31, Malaysian beauty queen and educator, stabbed.
- Thorleif Tharaldsen, 85, Norwegian footballer.
- Norman Tokar, 59, American film director, complications from a heart attack.

=== 7 ===
- Bruno Apitz, 78, German novelist.
- A. V. P. Asaithambi, 54, Indian politician.
- Jerry Butler, 50, American politician, member of the Texas House of Representatives (1959–1965).
- Carl Owen Dunbar, 88, American paleontologist.
- Svend Frømming, 60, Danish Olympic canoer (1956).
- Amir-Abbas Hoveyda, 60, Iranian politician, prime minister (1965–1977), execution by firing squad.
- Marcel Jouhandeau, 90, French writer.
- Justin Popović, 85, Serbian theologian and Serbian Orthodox saint.
- Charles W. Sawyer, 92, American diplomat and politician, secretary of commerce (1948–1953), lieutenant governor of Ohio (1933–1935), stroke.
- Friedrich Schlotterbeck, 70, German playwright and novelist.

=== 8 ===
- Joe Burman, 80, British-born American boxer, liver cancer.
- Joseph Callens, 75, Belgian Olympic swimmer and diver (1920, 1924).
- E. R. Dodds, 85, Irish classical scholar.
- Herbert Ganado, 73, Maltese writer and politician.
- Breece D'J Pancake, 26, American author, suicide by gunshot.
- Garrett Price, 82, American cartoonist and illustrator.
- Josef Stangl, 71, German Roman Catholic prelate.

=== 9 ===
- Manouchehr Azmoun, 48, Iranian politician, execution by firing squad.
- Artūrs Cavara, 77, Latvian-American singer.
- Staats Cotsworth, 71, American actor (Casey, Crime Photographer).
- Vladimir Fédorov, 77, Russian-French musicologist and composer.
- Margit Filó, 64, Hungarian serial killer
- Mary Gertrude Haseman, 90, American mathematician.
- Young Peter Jackson, 66, American boxer.
- Amy Kane, 99, New Zealand journalist and community leader.
- Amir Hossein Rabii, 48, Iranian politician and general, execution by firing squad.
- Doug Smith, 58, Canadian sportscaster.

=== 10 ===
- Alfred Bellerby, 91, British Olympic jumper (1908).
- Paul Benoit, 85, French organist and composer.
- James Clement Dunn, 88, American diplomat, heart attack.
- Frans Kaisiepo, 67, Indonesian politician.
- Sidney Kemble, 65, British Olympic weightlifter (1948).
- James A. Langille, 70, Canadian politician.
- James L. Malone, 71, American football and basketball coach.
- Nino Rota, 67, Italian composer (The Godfather), coronary thrombosis.
- Emil Rupp, 80, German physicist.
- Guglielmo Tagliacarne, 85, Italian statistician.
- Zoltán Várkonyi, 66, Hungarian actor and film director.

=== 11 ===
- Mohamed Akid, 29, Tunisian footballer, lightning strike.
- George O. Bierkoe, 83, American academic administrator.
- Leonid Bykov, 50, Soviet Ukrainian filmmaker, traffic collision.
- Arthur S. Champeny, 85, American general.
- Jimmy Clark, 70, Australian rugby player.
- Dame Isobel Cripps, 88, British aid organizer.
- Howard Cruse, 71, British Anglican prelate.
- Thomas Dachser, 73, German businessman.
- Thomas A. Duffy, 73, American politician, member of the New York State Assembly (1949–1956) and State Senate (1957–1965).
- Siegfried Knemeyer, 70, German-American aeronautical engineer.
- Gottfried Lessing, 64, Russian-born German diplomat, grenade explosion.
- Eddie Wilson, 69, American baseball player.
- Iranian government officials executed by firing squad on this date:
  - Hossein-Ali Bayat, 57, general
  - Ali Hojjat Kashani, 60, general and politician
  - Abbas Ali Khalatbari, 67, diplomat
  - Mohammad Taghi Majidi, 67, general
  - Nasser Moghaddam, 57, intelligence officer and general
  - Ali Neshat, 55–56, general
  - Gholamreza Nikpey, 51–52, politician, mayor of Tehran (1969–1977)
  - Hassan Pakravan, 67, diplomat
  - Abdollah Riazi, 73–74, politician
  - Mansour Rouhani, 56–57, politician

=== 12 ===
- Edward W. Anderson, 75, American general.
- Karl Anton, 80, German filmmaker.
- Thomas Bird, 74, Australian cricketer and footballer.
- Georges Bouligand, 89, French mathematician.
- Wilmot Hyde Bradley, 80, American geologist, stroke.
- Jean-Albert Brasu, 80, French Olympic equestrian (1956).
- John Dunnington-Jefferson, 95, English politician and soldier.
- Sam Edmonston, 95, American baseball player, arteriosclerosis.
- Hans von Kantzow, 91, Swedish engineer.
- Leo Ognall, 70, British novelist.
- Sigurd Overby, 79, American Olympic skier (1924).
- Đuro Pucar, 79, Yugoslav Bosnian politician.
- Corinne Boyd Riley, 85, American politician, member of the U.S. House of Representatives (1962–1963).
- Reginald Booth Stockdale, 71, British general.

=== 13 ===
- Edward Catich, 73, American calligrapher.
- Thomas Cholmondeley, 4th Baron Delamere, 78, British hereditary peer.
- Roy Daniells, 77, English-born Canadian poet.
- Olavi Elo, 66, Finnish Olympic sports shooter (1936, 1948).
- Bill Heindl Sr., 56, Canadian ice hockey player.
- Günter Henle, 80, German politician and music publisher.
- Konstantin Kabanov, 57, Soviet fighter pilot.
- Frankie Kelleher, 62, American baseball player, heart attack.
- Karl Persson, 89, Swedish footballer.
- Erik Qvam, 81, Norwegian writer.
- James Torello, 48, American mobster, cancer.
- Fred Worrall, 68, English footballer.
- Charlie Wrack, 79, English footballer.

=== 14 ===
- René Bouët-Willaumez, 78, French fashion illustrator.
- Buster Brannon, 70, American football and basketball player and coach, heart attack.
- Grover C. Dillman, 89, American engineer and politician.
- Clarence Dillon, 96, American financier and investment banker.
- Veliša Mugoša, 47, Yugoslav Olympic runner (1956).
- Billy James Pettis, 65–66, American mathematician.

=== 15 ===
- John Biggs Jr., 83, American jurist, heart attack.
- Sir David Brand, 66, Australian politician.
- Patricia Harper, 71, American screenwriter and actress.
- Friedrich-Wilhelm Hauck, 82, German general.
- Maria Irausquin-Wajcberg, 81, Aruban politician.
- Hanoch Kalai, 69, Russian-born Israeli Zionist militant (Lehi)
- Eiluned Lewis, 78, Welsh novelist and journalist.
- Harry Meyen, 54, German actor, suicide by hanging.
- Leonard Mociulschi, 90, Romanian general.
- Oddvar Wenner Nilssen, 58, Norwegian Olympic sports shooter (1952).
- Josef Tomášek, 75, Czech Olympic water polo player (1924).
- Arthur Tuck, 77, American Olympic track and field athlete (1920).
- Alba Rosa Viëtor, 89, Italian-American violinist and composer.

=== 16 ===
- Maria Caniglia, 73, Italian singer.
- Idania Fernandez, 26, Nicaraguan revolutionary, murdered.
- Walter Gore, 68, British ballet dancer and choreographer.
- Anatoly Kharlampiyev, 72, Soviet martial artist.
- Millard Naylor, 77, American football coach.
- James T. A. Osborne, 72, British painter.
- Frank Stewart, 56, Australian politician, MP (since 1953).
- P. J. Wolfson, 76, American novelist and filmmaker.

=== 17 ===
- Paolo Barison, 42, Italian footballer, traffic collision.
- Hal Burt, 78, American football player.
- Joe Conzelman, 89, American baseball player.
- Maria Korchinska, 84, Russian-British harpist.
- Luis Larrea Alba, 84, Ecuadorian politician, acting president (1931).
- Trygve Olsen, 57, Norwegian politician.
- Chuck Osborne, 40, American basketball player, traffic collision.
- Song Yunbin, 81, Chinese literary scholar and politician.
- Yukio Tsuda, 61, Japanese footballer, complications from Parkinson's disease.
- Elizabeth O'Neill Verner, 95, American artist.
- Louis Weller, 75, American football player, heart attack.

=== 18 ===
- Seán Brosnan, 62, Irish politician, TD (1969–1973, since 1974).
- Arthur John Capel, 84, British air marshal.
- Lindsay Deal, 67, American baseball player.
- Bob Dee, 45, American football player, heart attack.
- Esengül, 24, Turkish singer, traffic collision.
- Leandro Gómez, 77, Uruguayan basketball player.
- Jullan Kindahl, 94, Swedish actress.
- George J. Morgan, 67, Irish rugby player.
- Arico Suárez, 70, Spanish-Argentine footballer.
- Charles L. Sullivan, 54, American politician, lieutenant governor of Mississippi (1968–1972), plane crash.
- George Wadsworth, 76, British politician, MP (1945–1950).

=== 19 ===
- Asghar Ali, 54, Indian-Pakistani cricketer.
- Wilhelm Bittrich, 85, German general and war criminal.
- Erich Böhlke, 83, German conductor and composer.
- Antonio Centa, 71, Italian actor.
- Jim Crossan, 76, Australian footballer.
- Vladimir Khatuntsev, 62–63, Soviet news executive and journalist.
- Rogers Morton, 64, American politician, secretary of the interior (1971–1975) and commerce (1975–1976), member of the U.S. House of Representatives (1963–1971), prostate cancer.
- Shlomo Perlstein, 76, Austrian-born Israeli politician, MK (1951–1959, 1961–1969).
- Fred Ruiz Castro, 64, Filipino jurist, Chief Justice of the Philippines (since 1976), heart attack.
- August Sackenheim, 73, German footballer.

=== 20 ===
- William Baxter, 67, British politician, MP (1959–1974).
- Lujo Bezeredi, 80, Hungarian-Croatian sculptor.
- Jean Cotereau, 80, French politician.
- Dutch Dehnert, 81, American basketball player, heart attack.
- Peter Donald, 60, British-born American actor.
- Toivo Mäkelä, 69, Finnish actor.
- Kōji Mitsui, 69, Japanese actor.
- Jens Rud Nielsen, 84, Danish-American physicist.
- Hermogenes Valdebenito, 77, Chilean Olympic fencer (1936).

=== 21 ===
- Kauko Andersson, 66, Finnish politician.
- Cliff Bolton, 72, American baseball player.
- Madeleine Cazamian, 94, French writer, translator and English scholar.
- Grace Crowley, 88, Australian painter.
- Jim López, 66, Argentine football manager.
- Vic Obeck, 62, American football player and coach, heart attack.
- Ira Vail, 85, American racing driver.

=== 22 ===
- Sir Leon Bagrit, 77, Russian-born British businessman and automation pioneer.
- Amedeo Biavati, 64, Italian football player and manager.
- Curtis Boozman, 80, American politician, member of the Louisiana House of Representatives (1952–1956, 1960–1964).
- Edgar Brookes, 82, British-born South African politician.
- Vincent Costello, 73, South African cricket umpire.
- Madeline Gleason, 76, American poet.
- Li Shijie, 85, Chinese politician.
- Sidney Wilcox McCuskey, 72, American astronomer and mathematician.
- Leslie Phillips, 80, English cricketer.
- Pyotr Pospelov, 80, Soviet journalist and propagandist.

=== 23 ===
- Maurice Clavel, 58, French journalist and philosopher, heart attack.
- William Denton, 88, English cricketer.
- Francis James Furey, 74, American Roman Catholic prelate, cancer.
- Mohammad-Vali Gharani, 66, Iranian general, shot.
- Regis Monahan, 70, American football player, heart attack.
- Doug Rauch, 28, American bassist, drug overdose.
- Bill Kennedy Shaw, 77, British botanist and archaeologist.
- Paweł Zaremba, 63, Polish historian.

=== 24 ===
- Julio Abril, 67, Colombian artist.
- Dorothy Angus, 88, Scottish embroidery artist.
- Sabih Arca, 77–78, Turkish footballer.
- Marvella Bayh, 46, American journalist and politician, breast cancer.
- John Carroll, 72, American actor (Flying Tigers, Zorro Rides Again, Go West), leukemia.
- Ryenchinii Choinom, 43, Mongolian poet, tuberculosis.
- Juvenal Hernández, 79, Chilean politician and diplomat.
- Irma Karmol, 56, American politician, member of the Ohio House of Representatives (since 1975), traffic collision.
- Fred Koster, 73, American baseball player.
- Andrew Mukooza, 34, Ugandan fighter pilot, murdered.
- Sven Gösta Nilsson, 52, Swedish theoretical physicist.
- Maurice Orbach, 76, British politician, MP (1945–1959, 1964–1979).
- Blair Peach, 33, New Zealand educator and antiracist activist, head trauma.
- Julia Perry, 55, American composer.
- Max Romih, 85, Italian chess player.
- Van Day Truex, 75, American fashion designer, heart attack.

=== 25 ===
- Lew Carpenter, 65, American baseball player.
- Arthur Clark, 78, British Olympic runner (1924).
- Peter Eade, 60, English theatrical agent.
- Travers Hardwick, 56, New Zealand rugby player and coach.
- Samuel Norval Horner, 97, Canadian politician.
- Svend Jensen, 73, Danish footballer.
- B. Robert Lewis, 47, American politician, member of the Minnesota House of Representatives (since 1977), heart attack.
- Leopold Ludwig, 71, German conductor.
- Harvey Robinson, 71, American football player and coach.
- Vasily Shuleikin, 84, Soviet mathematician and engineer.
- Robert van 't Hoff, 91, Dutch architect and furniture designer.

=== 26 ===
- Julia Bell, 100, English geneticist.
- Al Day, 41, American football player.
- Sam Fife, 53, American sect leader (The Move), plane crash.
- Fuzzy Cupid, 50, American professional wrestler.
- Henry Hall, 56, British boxer.
- George Isaacs, 95, British politician and trade unionist, MP (1923–1924, 1929–1931, 1939–1959).
- Sir Robert Kerridge, 77, New Zealand businessman.
- Anthony Russo, 62, American mobster, shot.
- Trygve Stokstad, 76, Norwegian Olympic boxer (1920).
- Ranny Weeks, 72, American bandleader, academic administrator, and actor.

=== 27 ===
- Celal Atik, 58–59, Turkish Olympic wrestler (1948).
- Harold Everett, 87, English cricketer.
- Brian Field, 44, English convicted robbery conspirator (Great Train Robbery), traffic collision.
- Gutorm Gjessing, 73, Norwegian ethnographer and archaeologist.
- Sven Jerring, 83, Swedish radio presenter.
- Jim Mooney, 72, American baseball player.
- Phan Huy Quát, 70, Vietnamese politician, prime minister of South Vietnam (1965), liver failure.
- Mabel Pollitzer, 94, American suffragist and educator.
- Edward Ray Robinson, 85, American set decorator.
- Alex Simirenko, 47, Soviet Ukrainian-American sociologist.
- Willibald Schmaus, 66, Austrian footballer.
- Nikolai Vinogradov, 73, Soviet naval admiral.
- Gheorghe Vrănceanu, 78, Romanian mathematician.

=== 28 ===
- Maurie Beasy, 83, Australian footballer.
- Christopher D'Arcangelo, 24, American artist.
- Matt Forsyth, 82, Scottish footballer.
- Jack Fowler, 76, English footballer.
- Norman Kilner, 83, English cricketer.
- Felix Labunski, 86, Polish-born French-American composer.
- Erik Grant Lea, 86, Norwegian business magnate.
- Josephine Leslie, 80, Irish novelist.
- Henry McQuillan, 72, Canadian politician, MP (1958–1962).
- Carlos Muñiz Varela, 25, Cuban-born Puerto Rican journalist, shot.
- Karel Senecký, 60, Czechoslovak footballer.
- Ugo Spirito, 82, Italian philosopher, heart attack.

=== 29 ===
- John Allyn, 61, American baseball executive, heart attack.
- Mirza Rashid Ali Baig, 74, Indian diplomat and writer.
- Fred Coe, 64, American play, television and film director (A Thousand Clowns), heart attack.
- Ralph Cruddas, 78, British general.
- Muhsin Ertuğrul, 87, Turkish actor and film director, heart attack.
- Hardie Gramatky, 72, American artist and children's author (Little Toot), cancer.
- Clifford Kenyon, 82, British politician, MP (1945–1970).
- Rollo Mainguy, 77, Canadian naval admiral.
- John R. Quinn, 89, American politician.
- Harold K. Schilling, 80, American physicist.
- Raja Mahendra Pratap Singh, 92, Indian politician and independence activist.
- Antoni Śledź, 78, Polish footballer.

=== 30 ===
- Igor Buldakov, 48, Soviet Olympic rower (1956).
- Jaap Bulder, 82, Dutch footballer.
- Livio Castiglioni, 68, Italian architect.
- Peggy Dell, 73, Irish singer and pianist.
- Joan Bamford Fletcher, 69, Canadian nurse and humanitarian.
- Vicente Geigel Polanco, 74, Puerto Rican politician and writer.
- Pan Halippa, 95, Bessarabian-born Romanian politician and journalist.
- Wally Kopf, 79, American baseball player.
- Paul Massing, 76, German sociologist.
- Hugo Scharnberg, 85, German politician.
- Ted F. Schroeder, 76, American politician, member of the Washington House of Representatives (1935–1937) and Senate (1939–1953).
- Sigmund Sommer, 62, American real estate developer and racehorse owner, heart attack.
