= Majidi =

Majidi (Persian: مجیدی) is an Iranian and Arabic surname. Notable people with the surname include:

- Abdol Majid Majidi (1928–2014), Iranian politician
- Falah Al-Majidi (born 1970), Kuwaiti football player
- Farhad Majidi (born 1976), Iranian football player
- Farzad Majidi (born 1977), Iranian football player
- Khazal Al Majidi (born 1951), Iraqi Assyriologist and academic
- Meysam Majidi (born 1986), Iranian football player
- Majid Majidi (born 1959), Iranian film director
- Minoo Majidi (1960–2022), Iranian woman killed in the September 2022 Iranian protests
- Mohammad Taghi Majidi (1911–1979), Iranian army officer
- Mounir Majidi (born 1965), Moroccan businessman
- Mouzhan Majidi (born 1964), British-Iranian architect
- Selma Al-Majidi (born 1990), Sudanese football manager
- Shahin Majidi (born 1988), Iranian football player
