= Hamburg-Altona (electoral district) =

Federal electoral district of Germany

Coordinates: 53.55°N 9.9333°E

Wahlkreis 19: Hamburg-Altona
- Electoral district for the Bundestag
- Hamburg-Altona in 2025
- State: Hamburg
- Population: 267,900 (2019)
- Electorate: 187,705 (2021)
- Major settlements: Altona
- Area: 77.9 km^{2}

Current electoral district
- Created: 1949
- Party: GRÜNE
- Member: Linda Heitmann
- Elected: 2021, 2025

Hamburg-Altona is an electoral constituency (German: Wahlkreis) represented in the Bundestag. It elects one member via first-past-the-post voting. Under the current constituency numbering system, it is designated as constituency 19. It is located in western Hamburg, comprising the Altona borough.

Hamburg-Altona was created for the inaugural 1949 federal election. Since 2021, it has been represented by Linda Heitmann of the Alliance 90/The Greens.

== Geography ==
Hamburg-Altona is located in western Hamburg. As of the 2021 federal election, it is coterminous with the borough of Altona.

== History ==
Hamburg-Altona was created in 1949, then known as Hamburg II. From 1965 to 1980, it was simply named Altona. It acquired its current name in the 1980 election. In the inaugural Bundestag election, it was constituency 7 in the numbering system. From 1953 through 1961, it was number 16. From 1965 through 1998, it was number 13. From 2002 through 2009, it was number 20. Since 2013, it has been constituency 19.

Originally, it comprised the entirety of the Altona borough with the exception of the quarters of Altona-Altstadt and the Ortsteil of Altona-Nord/Süd from Altona-Nord. From 1965, it gained the Ortsteil of Altona-Altstadt/Nord, but lost the remainder of Altona-Nord. Since the 1980 election, it has been coterminous with the Altona borough, with a brief exception from 2009–2013 when the newly-created quarter of Sternschanze, administratively part of the Altona borough, remained within the Hamburg Mitte constituency; it was transferred to Hamburg-Altona in the 2013 election.

| Election | No. | Name | Borders |
|---|---|---|---|
| 1949 | 7 | Hamburg II | Altona borough (excluding Altona-Altstadt quarter and Altona-Nord/Süd Ortsteil) |
| 1953 | 16 | Hamburg II | Altona borough (excluding Altona-Altstadt quarter and Altona-Nord/Süd Ortsteil) |
| 1957 | 16 | Hamburg II | Altona borough (excluding Altona-Altstadt quarter and Altona-Nord/Süd Ortsteil) |
| 1961 | 16 | Hamburg II | Altona borough (excluding Altona-Altstadt quarter and Altona-Nord/Süd Ortsteil) |
| 1965 | 13 | Altona | Altona borough (excluding Altona-Altstadt/Süd Ortsteil) |
| 1969 | 13 | Altona | Altona borough (excluding Altona-Altstadt/Süd Ortsteil) |
| 1972 | 13 | Altona | Altona borough (excluding Altona-Altstadt/Süd Ortsteil) |
| 1976 | 13 | Altona | Altona borough (excluding Altona-Altstadt/Süd Ortsteil) |
| 1980 | 13 | Hamburg-Altona | Altona borough |
| 1983 | 13 | Hamburg-Altona | Altona borough |
| 1987 | 13 | Hamburg-Altona | Altona borough |
| 1990 | 13 | Hamburg-Altona | Altona borough |
| 1994 | 13 | Hamburg-Altona | Altona borough |
| 1998 | 13 | Hamburg-Altona | Altona borough |
| 2002 | 20 | Hamburg-Altona | Altona borough |
| 2005 | 20 | Hamburg-Altona | Altona borough |
| 2009 | 20 | Hamburg-Altona | Altona borough (excluding Sternschanze) |
| 2013 | 19 | Hamburg-Altona | Altona borough |
| 2017 | 19 | Hamburg-Altona | Altona borough |
| 2021 | 19 | Hamburg-Altona | Altona borough |
| 2025 | 19 | Hamburg-Altona | Altona borough |

== Members ==
The constituency has been held by the Social Democratic Party (SPD) during all but five Bundestag terms since 1949; it returned a representative from the SPD in every federal election from 1957 to 2021 with the exception of 1987. Its first representative was Hugo Scharnberg of the Christian Democratic Union (CDU), who served from 1949 to 1957. The SPD's Karl-Wilhelm Berkhan won the constituency in 1957 and served until 1976, when he was succeeded by Horst Gobrecht. The CDU held it for a single term in 1987 under representative Jürgen Echternach; it returned to the SPD's candidate Marliese Dobberthien in 1990. Future Federal Chancellor of Germany Olaf Scholz represented the constituency from 1998 to 2001, when he resigned to become Senator for the Interior of Hamburg. He was elected again in 2002 and was re-elected twice before resigning to take office as First Mayor of Hamburg. In the 2013 election, Matthias Bartke was elected as his successor. In 2021, the constituency was won by Linda Heltmann of the Greens.

| Election | Member | Party | % |
|---|---|---|---|
| 1949 | Hugo Scharnberg | CDU | 41.3 |
| 1953 | Hugo Scharnberg | CDU | 55.6 |
| 1957 | Karl Wilhelm Berkhan | SPD | 42.9 |
| 1961 | Karl Wilhelm Berkhan | SPD | 43.5 |
| 1965 | Karl Wilhelm Berkhan | SPD | 46.7 |
| 1969 | Karl Wilhelm Berkhan | SPD | 55.3 |
| 1972 | Karl Wilhelm Berkhan | SPD | 57.3 |
| 1976 | Horst Gobrecht | SPD | 50.1 |
| 1980 | Horst Gobrecht | SPD | 50.4 |
| 1983 | Horst Gobrecht | SPD | 47.4 |
| 1987 | Jürgen Echternach | CDU | 42.0 |
| 1990 | Marliese Dobberthien | SPD | 41.8 |
| 1994 | Marliese Dobberthien | SPD | 40.5 |
| 1998 | Olaf Scholz | SPD | 48.1 |
| 2002 | Olaf Scholz | SPD | 49.4 |
| 2005 | Olaf Scholz | SPD | 45.9 |
| 2009 | Olaf Scholz | SPD | 36.1 |
| 2013 | Matthias Bartke | SPD | 34.9 |
| 2017 | Matthias Bartke | SPD | 28.9 |
| 2021 | Linda Heitmann | GRÜNE | 29.7 |
| 2025 | Linda Heitmann | GRÜNE | 27.5 |

== Election results ==
=== 2025 election ===
Federal election (2025): Hamburg-Altona
| Notes: | Blue background denotes the winner of the electorate vote. Pink background denotes a candidate elected from their party list. Yellow background denotes an electorate win by a list member, or other incumbent. A ✓ or ✗ denotes status of any incumbent, win or lose respectively. | | | | | | |
| Party | Candidate | Votes | % | ±% | Party votes | % | ±% |
|---|---|---|---|---|---|---|---|
| Greens | ✓ Linda Heitmann | 43,349 | 27.5 | ▼2.2 | 37,452 | 23.7 | ▼6.7 |
| SPD | Sören Platten | 36,910 | 23.4 | ▼5.2 | 32,490 | 20.6 | ▼5.0 |
| CDU | Kaja Steffens | 33,392 | 21.2 | ▲4.4 | 30,863 | 19.5 | ▲4.7 |
| Left | Norbert Hackbusch | 25,270 | 16.0 | ▲6.4 | 28,455 | 18.0 | ▲9.0 |
| AfD | Bernd Baumann | 11,902 | 7.6 | ▲4.1 | 11,596 | 7.3 | ▲4.0 |
| FDP | Bo Müller | 5,278 | 3.4 | ▼4.8 | 7,377 | 4.7 | ▼6.2 |
| BSW | | | | | 5,244 | 3.3 | New |
| Volt | | | | | 2,263 | 1.4 | New |
| Tierschutzpartei | | | | | 1,134 | 0.7 | ▼0.2 |
| PARTEI | | | | | 603 | 0.4 | ▼0.7 |
| FW | Egge Diercksen | 1,029 | 0.7 | ▲0.2 | 362 | 0.2 | ▼0.1 |
| BD | | | | | 155 | 0.1 | New |
| MLPD | Christian Kölle | 408 | 0.3 | ▲0.1 | 101 | 0.1 | 0.0 |
| Informal votes | | 1,234 | | | 677 | | |
| Total valid votes | | 157,538 | | | 158,095 | | |
| Turnout | | 158,772 | 84.0 | ▲2.7 | | | |
| Greens hold | Majority | 6,439 | 4.1 | ▲3.0 | | | |

=== 2021 election ===
Federal election (2021): Hamburg-Altona
| Notes: | Blue background denotes the winner of the electorate vote. Pink background denotes a candidate elected from their party list. Yellow background denotes an electorate win by a list member, or other incumbent. A ✓ or ✗ denotes status of any incumbent, win or lose respectively. | | | | | | |
| Party | Candidate | Votes | % | ±% | Party votes | % | ±% |
|---|---|---|---|---|---|---|---|
| Greens | Linda Heitmann | 45,063 | 29.7 | ▲15.3 | 46,162 | 30.4 | ▲12.4 |
| SPD | ✗ Matthias Bartke | 43,427 | 28.6 | ▼0.4 | 38,865 | 25.6 | ▲5.1 |
| CDU | Marcus Weinberg | 25,441 | 16.8 | ▼9.2 | 22,478 | 14.8 | ▼10.1 |
| Left | Cansu Özdemir | 14,716 | 9.7 | ▼3.9 | 13,667 | 9.0 | ▼6.7 |
| FDP | Fabrice Henrici | 12,380 | 8.2 | ▼0.5 | 16,543 | 10.9 | ▼0.4 |
| AfD | Bernd Baumann | 5,191 | 3.4 | ▼1.7 | 5,036 | 3.3 | ▼2.2 |
| dieBasis | Ulrike Zens | 2,619 | 1.7 | | 2,237 | 1.5 | |
| PARTEI | | | | | 1,593 | 1.0 | ▼0.6 |
| Tierschutzpartei | | | | | 1,405 | 0.9 | ▲0.2 |
| Team Todenhöfer | | | | | 1,054 | 0.7 | |
| Volt | | | | | 886 | 0.6 | |
| Pirates | Frieder Kirsch | 1,351 | 0.9 | | 571 | 0.4 | |
| FW | Daniel Meincke | 756 | 0.5 | ▲0.2 | 524 | 0.3 | ▲0.1 |
| ÖDP | Kalotta Ahrens | 571 | 0.4 | | 246 | 0.2 | 0.0 |
| du. | | | | | 228 | 0.1 | |
| V-Partei3 | | | | | 160 | 0.1 | ▼0.1 |
| Humanists | | | | | 129 | 0.1 | |
| DKP | | | | | 92 | 0.1 | 0.0 |
| MLPD | Christian Kölle | 209 | 0.1 | 0.0 | 84 | 0.1 | 0.0 |
| Independent | Bérangère Bultheel | 159 | 0.1 | | | | |
| NPD | | | | | 56 | 0.0 | ▼0.1 |
| Bündnis 21 | | | | | 55 | 0.0 | |
| LKR | | | | | 24 | 0.0 | |
| Informal votes | | 837 | | | 625 | | |
| Total valid votes | | 151,883 | | | 152,095 | | |
| Turnout | | 152,720 | 81.4 | ▲2.8 | | | |
| Greens gain from SPD | Majority | 1,636 | 1.1 | | | | |

=== 2017 election ===
Federal election (2017): Hamburg-Altona
| Notes: | Blue background denotes the winner of the electorate vote. Pink background denotes a candidate elected from their party list. Yellow background denotes an electorate win by a list member, or other incumbent. A ✓ or ✗ denotes status of any incumbent, win or lose respectively. | | | | | | |
| Party | Candidate | Votes | % | ±% | Party votes | % | ±% |
|---|---|---|---|---|---|---|---|
| SPD | ✓ Matthias Bartke | 41,947 | 28.9 | ▼6.0 | 29,680 | 20.4 | ▼9.3 |
| CDU | Marcus Weinberg | 37,575 | 25.9 | ▼6.5 | 36,139 | 24.9 | ▼4.6 |
| Greens | Filiz Demirel | 20,817 | 14.4 | ▲0.7 | 26,036 | 17.9 | ▲1.4 |
| Left | Robert Jarowoy | 19,704 | 13.6 | ▲3.4 | 22,766 | 15.7 | ▲4.9 |
| FDP | Katja Suding | 12,482 | 8.6 | ▲6.7 | 16,306 | 11.2 | ▲5.8 |
| AfD | Bernd Baumann | 7,425 | 5.1 | ▲2.8 | 8,028 | 5.5 | ▲2.3 |
| PARTEI | Alexander Grupe | 3,471 | 2.4 | ▲1.4 | 2,374 | 1.6 | ▲0.8 |
| Tierschutzpartei | | | | | 1,093 | 0.8 | |
| BGE | | | | | 787 | 0.5 | |
| DiB | | | | | 722 | 0.5 | |
| FW | Daniel Meincke | 490 | 0.3 | 0.0 | 341 | 0.2 | ▼0.1 |
| Independent | Bérangère Bultheel | 320 | 0.2 | | | | |
| Independent | Frank Hofer | 286 | 0.2 | | | | |
| ÖDP | | | | | 284 | 0.2 | |
| V-Partei³ | | | | | 284 | 0.2 | |
| MLPD | Narziss Nianur | 256 | 0.2 | ▲0.1 | 149 | 0.1 | 0.0 |
| Independent | Brigitte Vollmer | 156 | 0.1 | | | | |
| NPD | | | | | 150 | 0.1 | ▼0.3 |
| DKP | | | | | 87 | 0.1 | |
| Informal votes | | 1,161 | | | 864 | | |
| Total valid votes | | 144,929 | | | 145,226 | | |
| Turnout | | 146,090 | 78.6 | ▲4.2 | | | |
| SPD hold | Majority | 4,372 | 3.0 | ▲0.6 | | | |

=== 2013 election ===
Federal election (2013): Hamburg-Altona
| Notes: | Blue background denotes the winner of the electorate vote. Pink background denotes a candidate elected from their party list. Yellow background denotes an electorate win by a list member, or other incumbent. A ✓ or ✗ denotes status of any incumbent, win or lose respectively. | | | | | | |
| Party | Candidate | Votes | % | ±% | Party votes | % | ±% |
|---|---|---|---|---|---|---|---|
| SPD | Matthias Bartke | 46,918 | 34.9 | ▼0.9 | 40,009 | 29.8 | ▲4.6 |
| CDU | Marcus Weinberg | 43,609 | 32.4 | ▲2.7 | 39,581 | 29.4 | ▲3.6 |
| Greens | Anjes Tjarks | 18,380 | 13.7 | ▼0.6 | 22,167 | 16.5 | ▼2.8 |
| Left | Jan van Aken | 13,759 | 10.2 | ▲0.2 | 14,525 | 10.8 | ▼1.5 |
| AfD | Ralf Kettnaker | 3,094 | 2.3 | | 4,321 | 3.2 | |
| Pirates | Thembi Gräntzdörffer | 3,005 | 2.2 | | 3.630 | 2.7 | 0.0 |
| FDP | Lorenz Flemming | 2,627 | 2.0 | ▼6.1 | 7,353 | 5.5 | ▼7.6 |
| PARTEI | Beatrice Winkler | 1,359 | 1.0 | | 1,089 | 0.8 | |
| NPD | Peter Adler | 515 | 0.4 | ▼0.2 | 528 | 0.4 | ▼0.2 |
| Independent | Joachim Fiedler | 505 | 0.4 | | | | |
| FW | Wolf Achim Wiegand | 497 | 0.4 | | 384 | 0.3 | |
| RENTNER | | | | | 420 | 0.3 | |
| ÖDP | | | | | 334 | 0.2 | ▼0.2 |
| MLPD | Jürgen Bader | 135 | 0.1 | 0.0 | 123 | 0.1 | 0.0 |
| Informal votes | | 1,454 | | | 1,393 | | |
| Total valid votes | | 134,403 | | | 134,464 | | |
| Turnout | | 135,857 | 74.3 | ▼0.6 | | | |
| SPD hold | Majority | 3,309 | 2.5 | ▼3.3 | | | |

=== 2009 election ===
Federal election (2009): Hamburg-Altona
| Notes: | Blue background denotes the winner of the electorate vote. Pink background denotes a candidate elected from their party list. Yellow background denotes an electorate win by a list member, or other incumbent. A ✓ or ✗ denotes status of any incumbent, win or lose respectively. | | | | | | |
| Party | Candidate | Votes | % | ±% | Party votes | % | ±% |
|---|---|---|---|---|---|---|---|
| SPD | ✓ Olaf Scholz | 46,522 | 36.0 | ▼9.9 | 32,633 | 25.2 | ▼10.0 |
| CDU | Marcus Weinberg | 38,969 | 30.2 | ▼3.6 | 33,916 | 26.2 | ▼2.2 |
| Greens | Katharina Fegebank | 17,799 | 13.8 | ▲2.3 | 24,462 | 18.9 | ▲0.1 |
| Left | Bernhard Müller | 12,605 | 9.8 | ▲4.9 | 15,670 | 12.1 | ▲5.5 |
| FDP | Katja Suding | 10,517 | 8.1 | ▲4.8 | 17,028 | 13.2 | ▲4.1 |
| Pirates | | | | | 3,344 | 2.6 | |
| Independent | Ronald Saß | 954 | 0.7 | | | | |
| NPD | Ursula Winkler | 771 | 0.6 | ▼0.1 | 795 | 0.6 | ▼0.1 |
| RENTNER | | | | | 755 | 0.6 | |
| ÖDP | Karl-Peter Grube | 709 | 0.5 | | 545 | 0.4 | |
| MLPD | Jürgen Bader | 158 | 0.1 | | 84 | 0.1 | 0.0 |
| BüSo | | 150 | 0.1 | | | | |
| DVU | | | | | 104 | 0.1 | |
| Informal votes | | 1,475 | | | 1,294 | | |
| Total valid votes | | 129,155 | | | 129,336 | | |
| Turnout | | 130,630 | 75.1 | ▼4.7 | | | |
| SPD hold | Majority | 7,553 | 5.8 | ▼6.3 | | | |

=== 2005 election ===
Federal election (2005):Hamburg-Altona
| Notes: | Blue background denotes the winner of the electorate vote. Pink background denotes a candidate elected from their party list. Yellow background denotes an electorate win by a list member, or other incumbent. A ✓ or ✗ denotes status of any incumbent, win or lose respectively. | | | | | | |
| Party | Candidate | Votes | % | ±% | Party votes | % | ±% |
|---|---|---|---|---|---|---|---|
| SPD | ✓ Olaf Scholz | 61,936 | 45.9 | ▼3.5 | 47,600 | 35.2 | ▼2.7 |
| CDU | Marcus Weinberg | 45,468 | 33.7 | ▲1.9 | 38,333 | 28.4 | ▲0.5 |
| Greens | Christa Goetsch | 15,507 | 11.5 | ▲0.6 | 25,387 | 18.8 | ▼1.4 |
| Left | Robert Jarowoy | 6,492 | 4.8 | ▲2.8 | 8,914 | 6.6 | ▲3.7 |
| FDP | Rose-Felicitas Pauly | 4,444 | 3.3 | ▼1.6 | 12,185 | 9.0 | ▲2.0 |
| NPD | Anja Zysk | 973 | 0.7 | ▲0.2 | 951 | 0.7 | ▲0.5 |
| Tierschutzpartei | | | | | 851 | 0.6 | |
| PARTEI | | | | | 459 | 0.3 | |
| APPD | | | | | 269 | 0.2 | |
| MLPD | | | | | 86 | 0.1 | |
| Informal votes | | 1,552 | | | 1,335 | | |
| Total valid votes | | 134,820 | | | 135,037 | | |
| Turnout | | 136,372 | 79.8 | ▼1.7 | | | |
| SPD hold | Majority | 16,468 | 12.2 | | | | |
