= Cruddas =

Cruddas is a surname of Scottish origin; a habitation name (one of two types of locational surname) from a place in the southern Scottish Lowlands, more particularly in the Scottish Southern Uplands.

== Etymology ==
The Cruddas surname, like its more popular cognate Carruthers, indicates a place in modern Dumfries and Galloway which is but a few miles east of the town of Dumfries, called in modern times Carrutherstown. In the Scots dialect of English of the late Middle Ages this place was known as Caer Ruther, which meant "the fort of Ruther". Said Caer Ruther in turn derived from Brythonic Celtic elements as follows: Scots caer derived from the Brythonic term ker, meaning "fort", and Ruther deriving from the Cumbric Brythonic Rhydderch, a personal name thought to have meant "red ruler". Cruddas, then, can be said to derive from the Brythonic place name "ker Rhydderch", meaning "the fort of Rhydderch". Differing variants (cognates) of the Cruddas surname include: Caruth, Carruthers, Carrothers, Crothers; Carradice, Carrodus, Cardis, Cardus; Crowdace, and Cruddace, all of which reference said "ker Rhydderch". It bears mentioning that not all, or even any particular two, of the families or lineages bearing one of the aforementioned cognate surnames are necessarily related, either socially or genetically, as the "Cruddas DNA Project" has confirmed (for instance, I-M253 refers to Carruthers and R-M269 refers to Cruddas); it is only the names which are related etymologically.

== People ==
Notable people with the surname Cruddas include:

- Audrey Cruddas (1912–1979), British costume designer
- Bernard Cruddas (1882–1959), British politician
- Jon Cruddas (born 1962), British politician
- Peter Cruddas (born 1953), British banker and politician
- Ralph Cruddas (1900–1979), British military officer
- Sarah Cruddas (born 1984), British journalist
- Josh Cruddas (born 1991), Canadian actor and composer
