= Karl Wilhelm Berkhan =

German politician

- Berkhan in 1971

Member of the Bundestag
- In office 15 October 1957 – 19 March 1975
- Preceded by: Hugo Scharnberg
- Succeeded by: Siegfried Röhlig
- Constituency: Hamburg II (1957–1965); Altona (1965–1975)

Member of the Hamburg Parliament
- In office November 1953 – November 1957

Personal details
- Born: 8 April 1915 Hamburg, Germany
- Died: 9 March 1994 (aged 78) Hamburg, Germany
- Resting place: Ohlsdorf Cemetery
- Party: Social Democratic
- Education: Wilhelm-Gymnasium

Karl Wilhelm Berkhan (8 April 1915 – 9 March 1994), also known as Willi Berkhan, was a German politician, representative of the Social Democratic Party.

== See also ==
- List of Social Democratic Party of Germany politicians
