= Linda Heitmann =

German politician (born 1982)

Linda Heitmann MdB
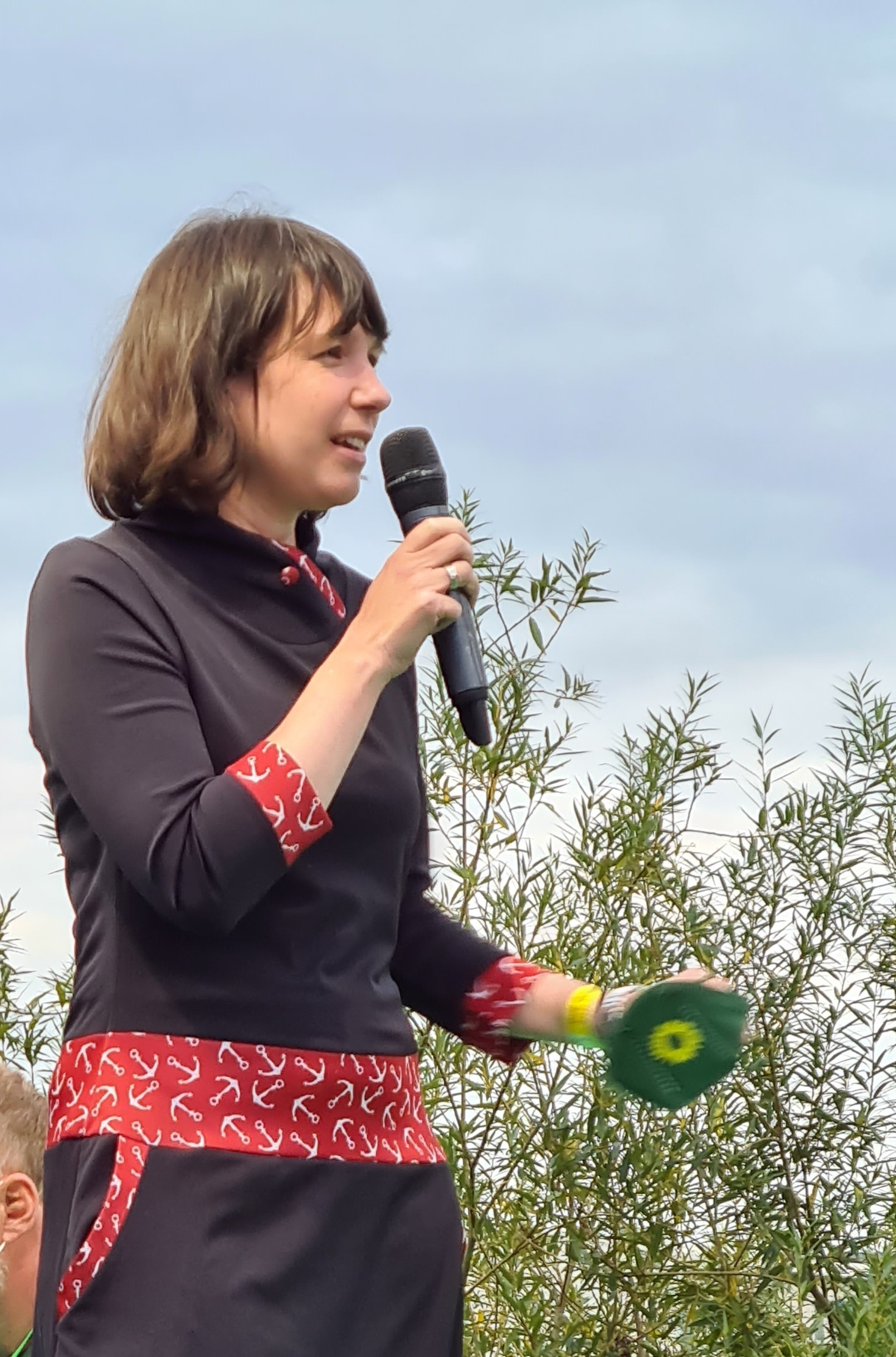
- Heitmann in 2021

Member of the Bundestag; for Hamburg-Altona
- Incumbent
- Assumed office 26 October 2021
- Preceded by: Matthias Bartke

Member of the Hamburg Parliament; for Altona
- In office 7 May 2008 – 29 November 2010
- Preceded by: Christa Goetsch
- Succeeded by: Christa Goetsch

Personal details
- Born: 2 August 1982 (age 44) Hamburg, West Germany
- Party: Alliance 90/The Greens
- Children: 1
- Education: University of Hamburg

Linda Heitmann (born 2 August 1982) is a German politician of the Alliance 90/The Greens who has been serving as a member of the Bundestag since the 2021 German federal election, representing the constituency of Hamburg-Altona.

== Life ==
Heitmann attended grammar school in Schenefeld from 1994 to 2002 and studied political science and geography at the University of Hamburg and in Cork (Ireland) from 2003 to 2008. In October 2008, she completed her studies in Hamburg with a degree in political science. She is married and has one daughter.

== Political career ==
Heitmann has been a member of Bündnis 90/Die Grünen since 2003. From 2005 to 2008, she was a member of the state executive committee of the Green Yout Hamburg and was its chairwoman from 2006 to May 2008. She was a deputy in the Ministry of the Interior from 2006 to 2008 and held this position again from 2015 to 2020.

In the 2008 Hamburg parliamentary elections, she stood in the Altona constituency in 5th place on the constituency list and 13th place on the state list. On 7 May 2008, she replaced Christa Goetsch, who became Senator for Schools, Vocational and Further Education, in the Hamburg parliament.

From October 2009 to 2010, Linda Heitmann was chairwoman of the GAL district association in Hamburg-Altona. After a stay in Baden-Württemberg, where she worked as deputy press spokeswoman for the state association, she was a member of the state executive of the Hamburg Greens from 2015 to 2017, where she was spokeswoman for women's policy. After holding various professional positions for Bündnis 90/Die Grünen, she has headed the "Hamburg State Centre for Addiction Issues" since 2016.

In the 2021 Bundestag election, Heitmann was directly elected to the German Bundestag for Bündnis 90/Die Grünen in the Hamburg-Altona constituency. She won with 29.6% of the first votes against the previously directly elected MP Matthias Bartke, who lost to her with 28.6% of the first votes.

Heitmann has been serving on the Health Committee and the Committee on the Environment, Nature Conservation, Nuclear Safety, and Consumer Protection since 2022. She is also a deputy member of the Committee on Labour and Social Affairs and the Committee on Family Affairs, Senior Citizens, Women and Youth.

== Other activities ==
- Heinrich Böll Foundation Hamburg, board member (since April 2018)
- Federal Network Agency for Electricity, Gas, Telecommunications, Post and Railway (BNetzA), Alternate Member of the Advisory Board (since 2022)
- German Foundation for Consumer Protection (DSV), Member of the Board of Trustees (since 2022)

== Author ==
In 2015, Linda Heitmann published a travel guide titled "With children in Hamburg", which was last published in 2019 in its third revised edition.
