= Wayne Connally =

American politician (1923–2000)

- Connally in 1972

Member of the Texas House of Representatives from the 58th district
- In office January 12, 1965 – January 10, 1967
- Preceded by: Jerry Butler
- Succeeded by: W. S. Pickett

Member of the Texas Senate from the 21st district
- In office January 10, 1967 – January 9, 1973
- Preceded by: Abraham Kazen
- Succeeded by: John Traeger

Personal details
- Born: Wayne Wright Connally; March 19, 1923 Floresville, Texas, U.S.
- Died: December 20, 2000 (aged 77) Cody, Wyoming, U.S.
- Party: Democratic
- Relatives: John Connally (brother)
- Education: University of Texas at Austin

Wayne Wright Connally (March 19, 1923 – December 20, 2000) was an American politician. He served as a Democratic member for the 58th district of the Texas House of Representatives. He also served as a member for the 21st district of the Texas Senate.

== Life and career ==
Born in Floresville, Texas, the son of Lela and John Connally Sr. His brother was John Connally, later governor of Texas. He graduated from Floresville High School in 1940 and attended the University of Texas at Austin.

Connally served in the United States Army Air Forces during World War II for three years until February 1946, and later joined his brother John in politics. In 1965, Connally was elected to represent the 58th district of the Texas House of Representatives. In 1967, he was elected to the Texas Senate in the 21st district, succeeding Abraham Kazen. He was succeeded by John Traeger in 1973.

Connally moved to Cody, Wyoming and lived there until his death in December 2000 at the age of 77. His body was cremated.
