= Russian destroyer Admiral Vinogradov =

Destroyer of the Russian Navy

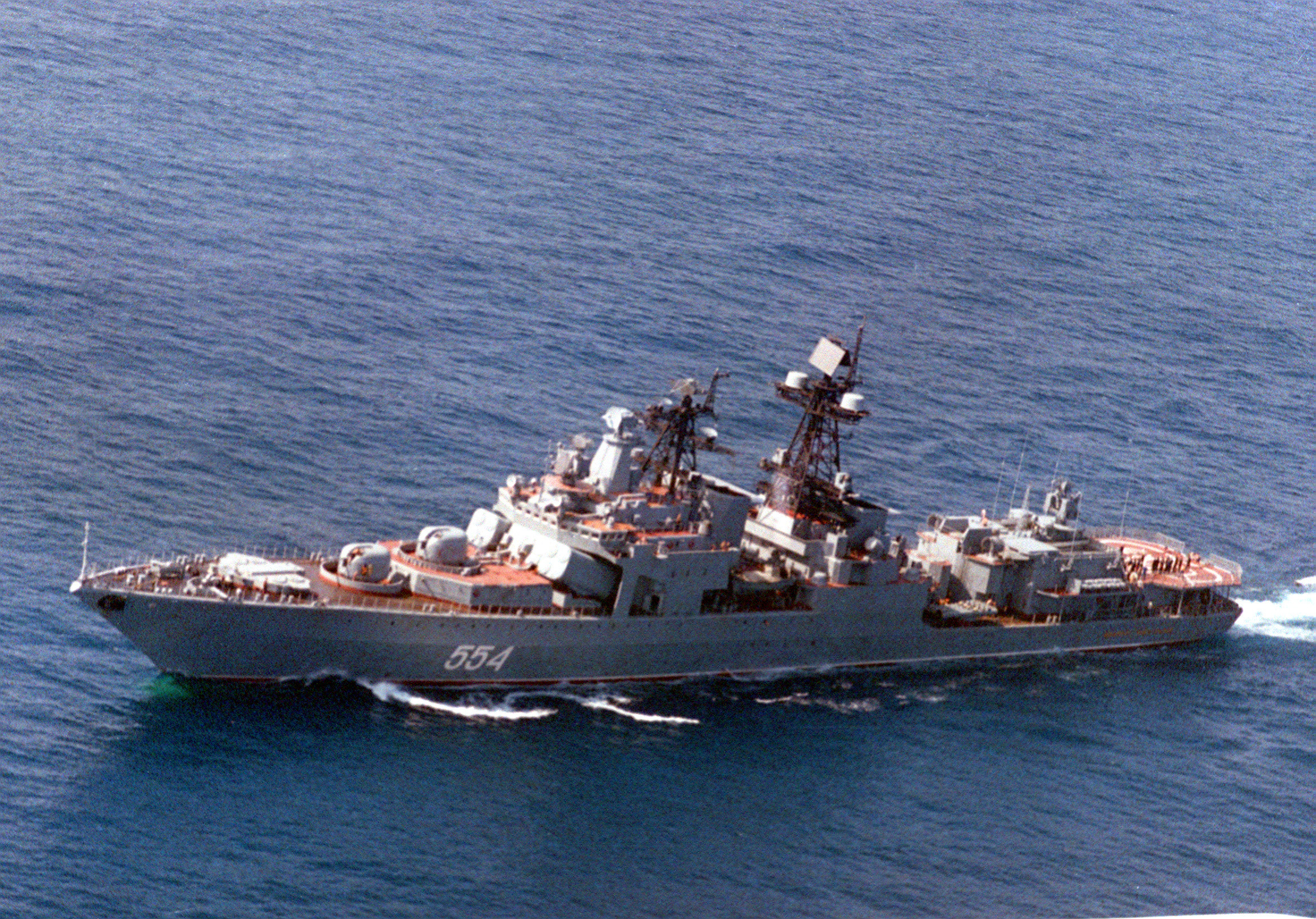
- Admiral Vinogradov underway in 1992

History

→ Soviet Union → Russia
- Name: Admiral Vinogradov
- Namesake: Nikolai Ignatevich Vinogradov
- Laid down: 5 February 1986
- Launched: 4 June 1987
- Commissioned: 30 December 1988
- Status: Undergoing refit

General characteristics
- Class & type: Udaloy-class destroyer
- Displacement: 6,200 t (6,102 long tons) standard; 7,900 t (7,775 long tons) full load
- Length: 162.99 m (534 ft 9 in)
- Beam: 19.30 m (63 ft 4 in)
- Draught: 6.20 m (20 ft 4 in)
- Propulsion: 2 shaft COGAG, 4 gas turbines, 89,000 kW (120,000 hp)
- Speed: 35 knots (65 km/h; 40 mph)
- Range: 10,500 nautical miles (19,400 km) at 14 knots (26 km/h; 16 mph)
- Complement: 300
- Armament: 2 × 4 SS-N-14 anti-submarine missiles; 8 × vertical launchers for SA-N-9 surface-to-air missiles; 2 × 1 100 mm (3.9 in) guns; 4 × 30 mm Gatling guns; 2 × 4 553 mm (21.8 in) torpedo tubes, Type 53 ASW/ASuW torpedo; 2 × RBU-6000 anti-submarine rocket launchers
- Aircraft carried: 2 x Ka-27 'Helix' series helicopters
- Aviation facilities: Helicopter deck and hangar

Admiral Vinogradov is an Udaloy-class destroyer of the Russian Navy; it is currently active with the Russian Pacific Fleet. It is named for Admiral Nikolai Ignatevich Vinogradov.

== History ==
Admiral Vinogradov was laid down in the former Soviet Union in February 1986 and was launched in June 1987. The ship was commissioned and joined the Pacific Fleet on 30 December 1988. In August 1990, she was one of three Soviet warships to visit San Diego, California. After the fall of the Soviet regime in 1991 the destroyer joined the new Russian Navy.

Admiral Vinogradov was deployed to the Persian Gulf alongside UK and NATO ships to enforce United Nations (UN) resolutions on Iraq in September 1992 along with the Russian tanker Boris Butoma.

On 17 November 2010, the ship left Vladivostok to Gulf of Aden to participate in the UN anti-piracy mission of the Horn of Africa. The ship was seen shadowing several US naval vessels during the RIMPAC 2016 naval exercise near Hawaii. In September 2016 the destroyer participated in the joint Russian-Chinese exercise in the South China Sea.

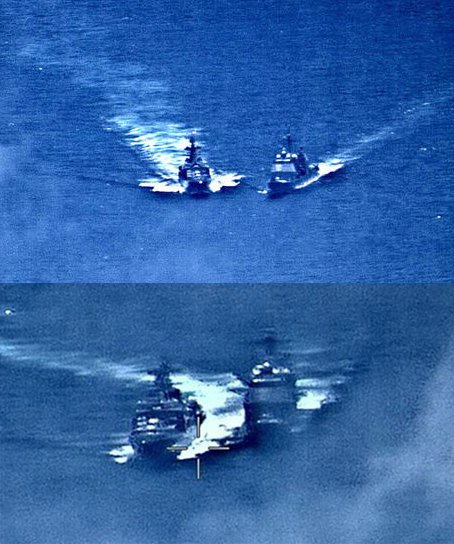
Admiral Vinogradov (left) and USS Chancellorsville nearly collide

On 7 June 2019, Admiral Vinogradov came close to colliding with USS Chancellorsville. Each side blamed the other for the near collision. Russian sources stated that the incident occurred in the southeast of the East China Sea while US sources named the location as in the Philippine Sea. The Russian Navy claimed that the US ship made an unsafe maneuver, with Admiral Vinogradov forced to change course in order to avoid a collision. The Russian military also claimed to have sent a protest to the US Navy. However, according to retired US Navy captain Carl Schuster, the Russian ship's wake shows that it "didn't adhere to either the rules of the road or the incidents at sea agreement." United States Seventh Fleet spokesman Commander Clayton Doss said the Russian destroyer came within 50 to 100 feet (15 to 30 m) of USS Chancellorsville, "putting the safety of her crew and ship at risk." As of 2020, Admiral Vinogradov entered refit to upgrade to the standard of her sister ship, Marshal Shaposhnikov. She had been expected to return to service in 2024–2025, though her status was unclear as of 2026.

== Gallery ==
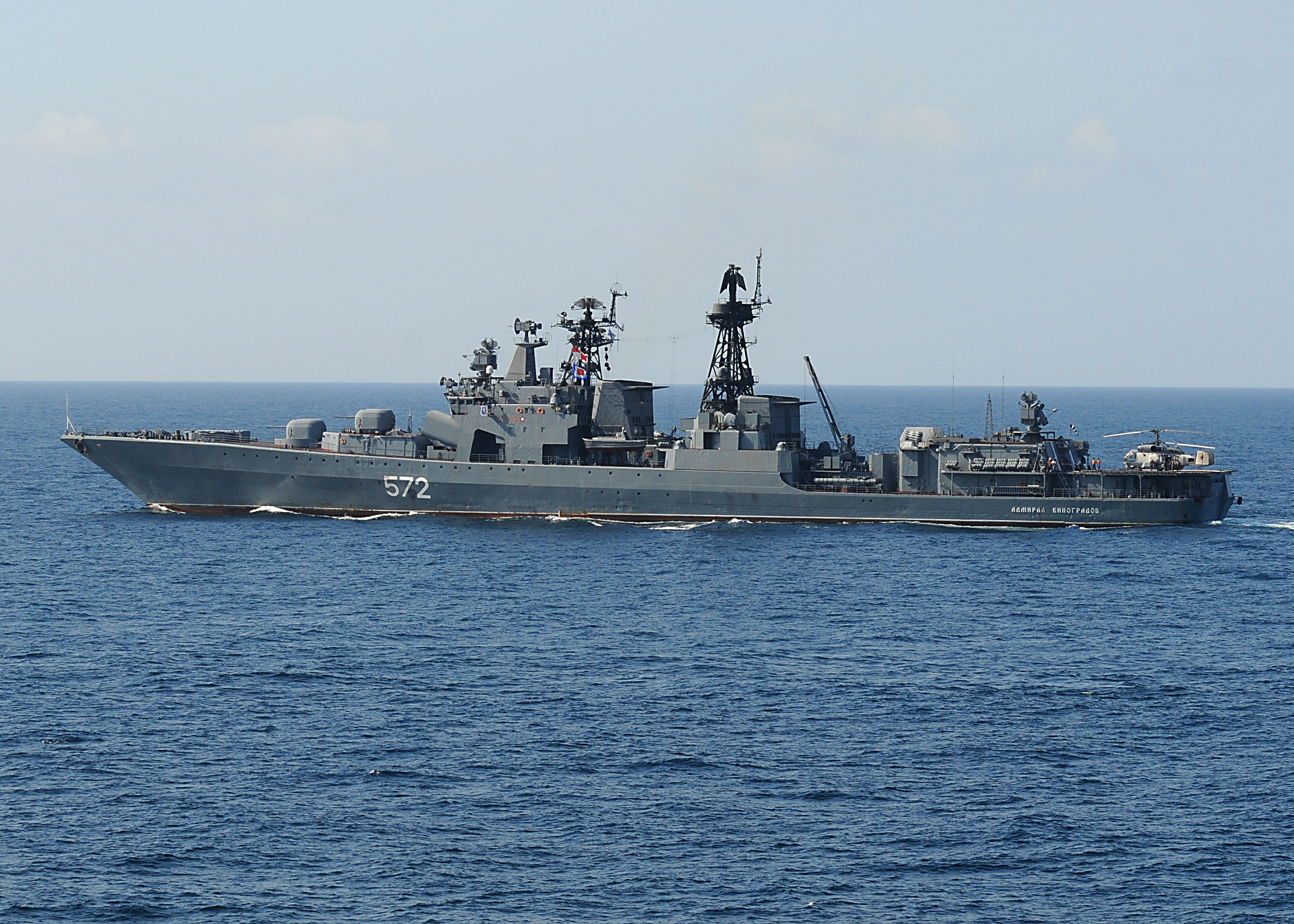

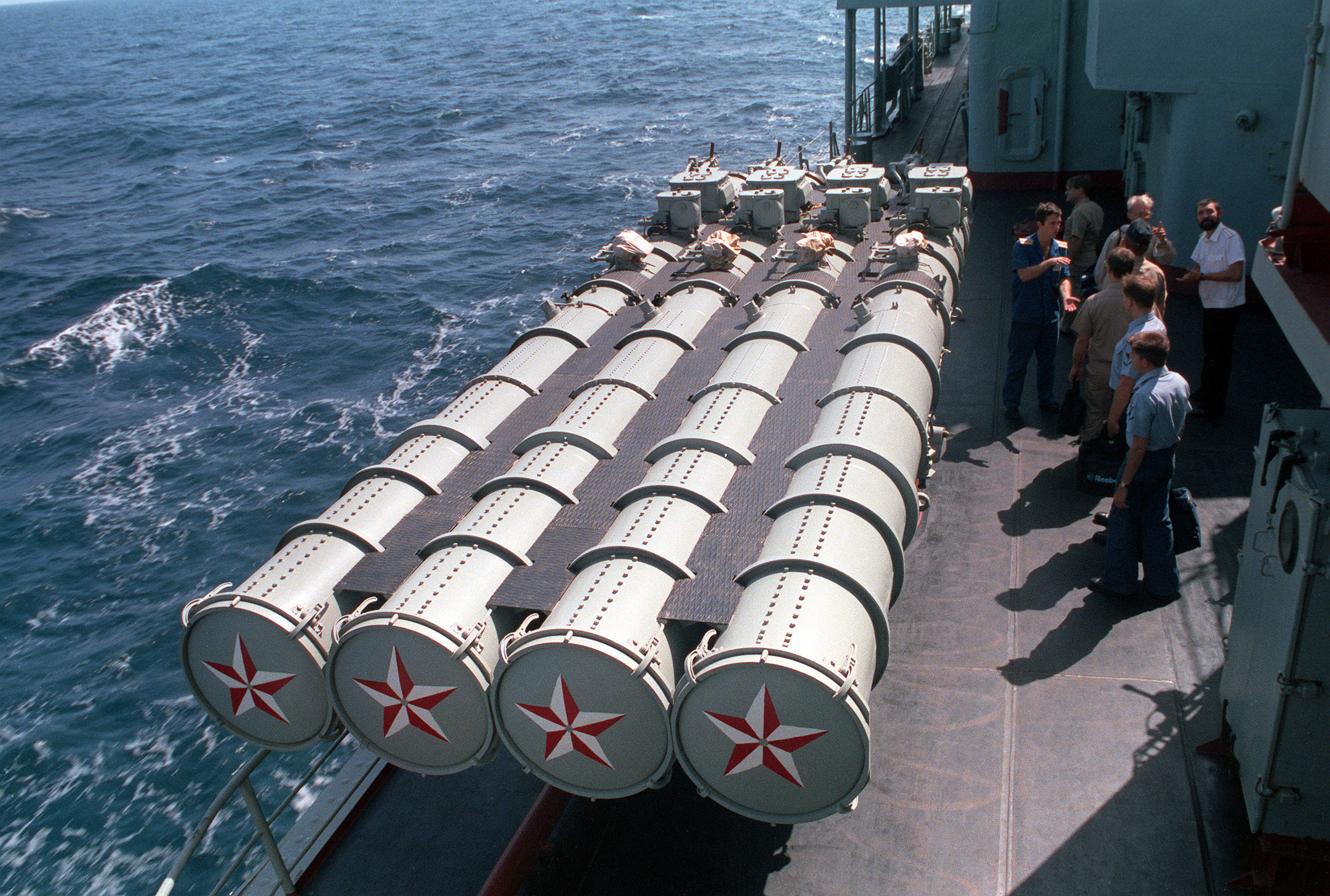

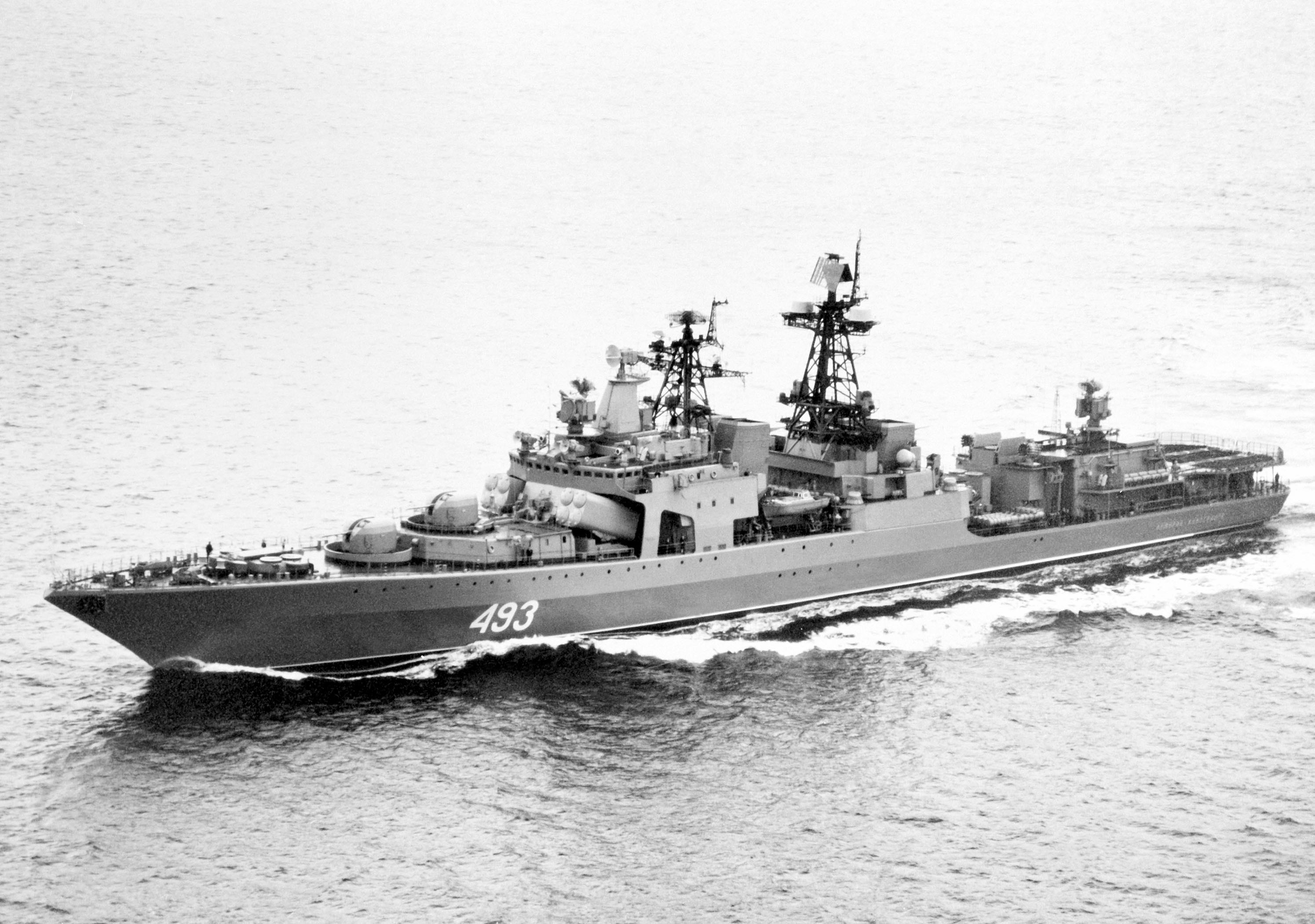

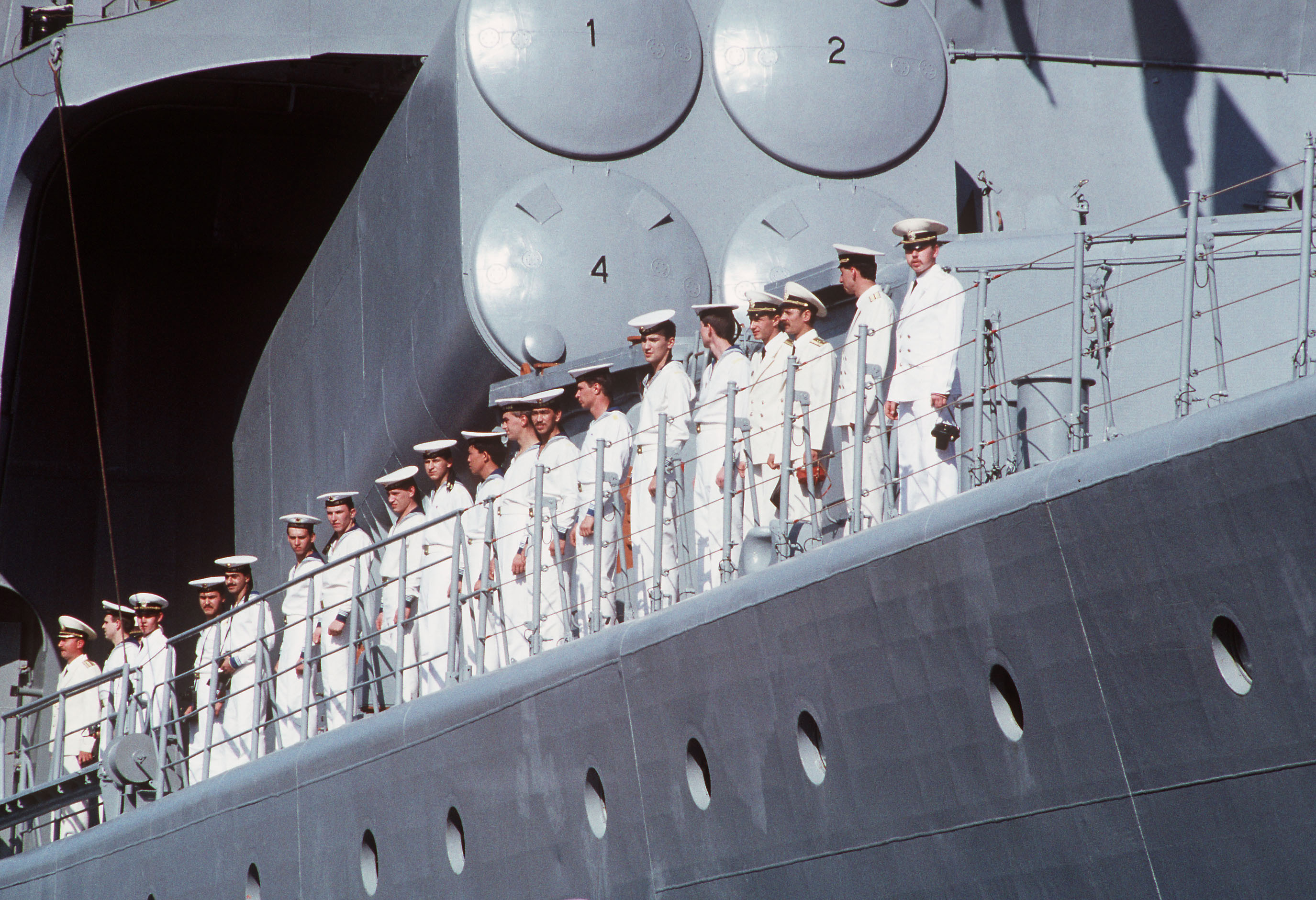

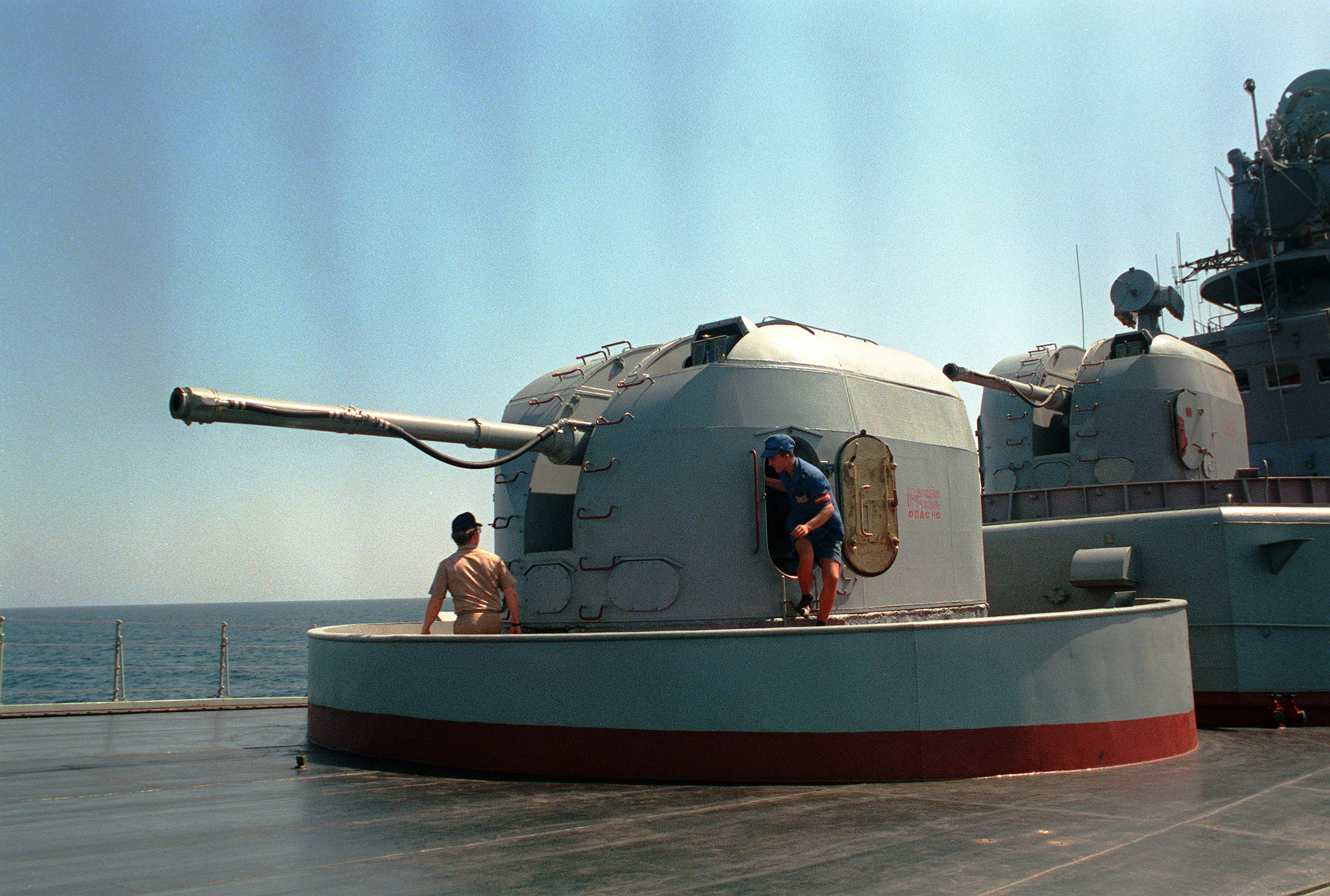

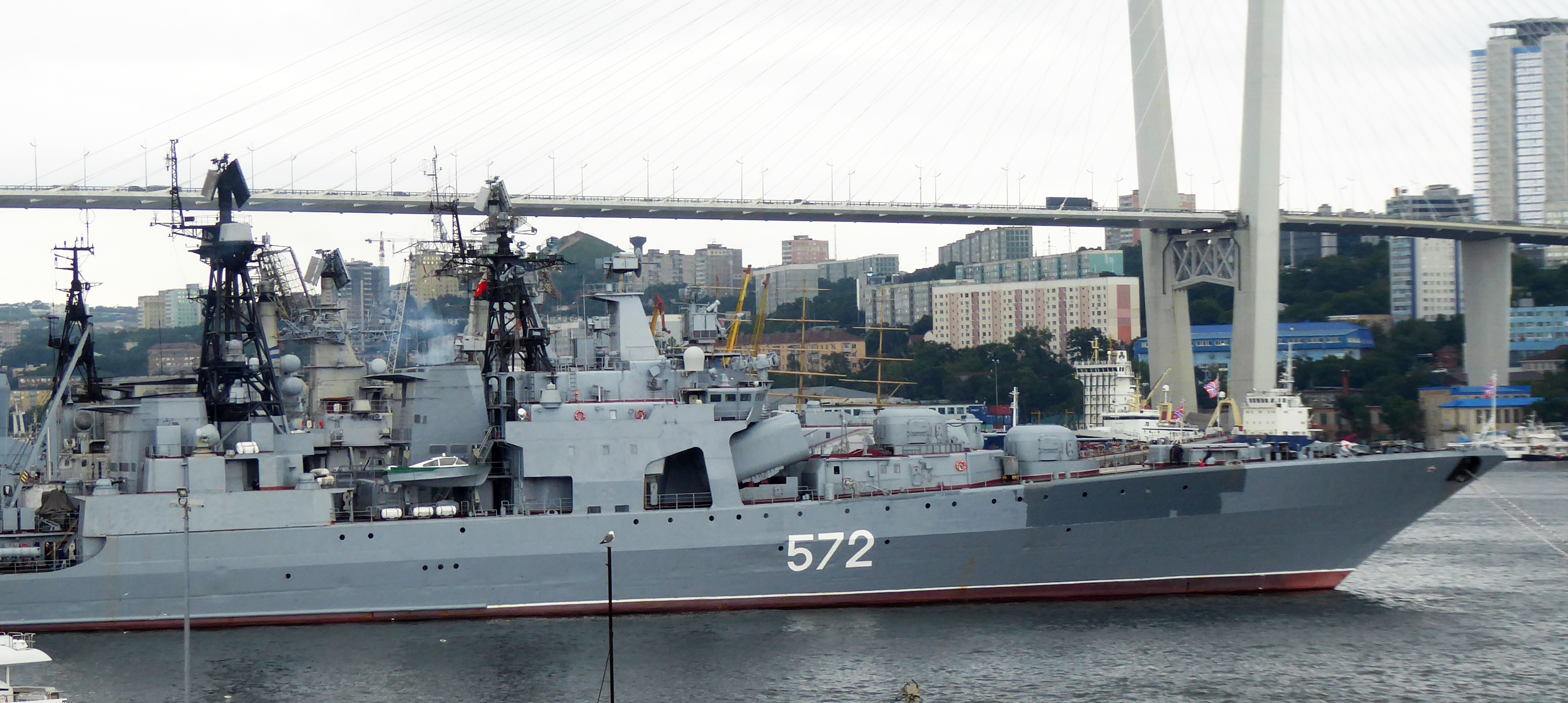

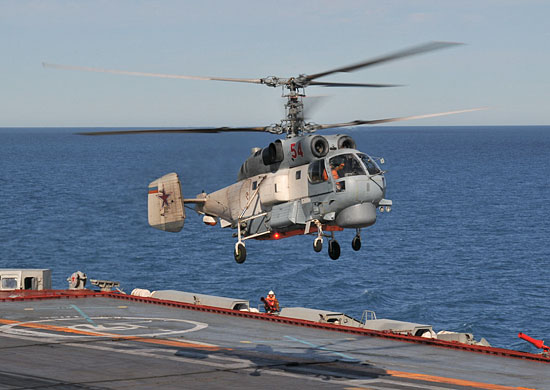

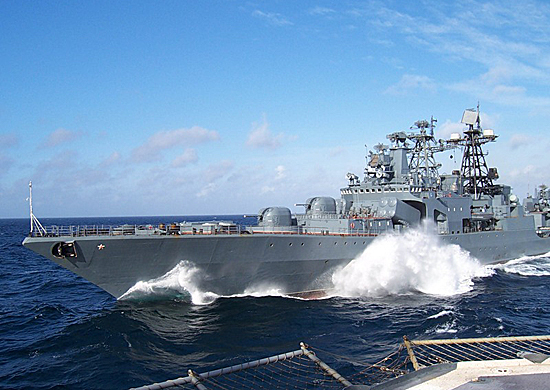
