= Matthias Bartke =

German politician

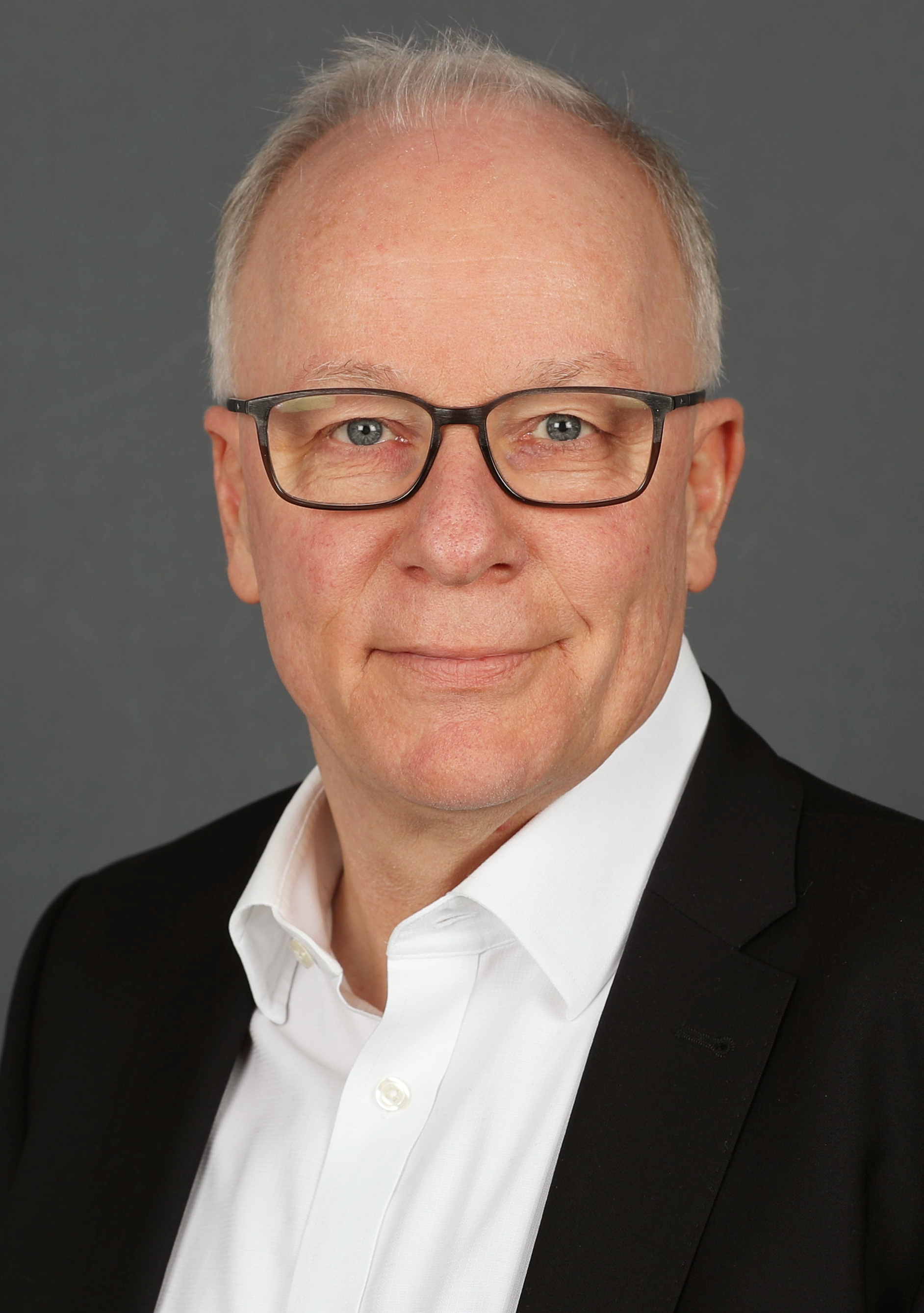
- Bartke in 2020

Chair of the Labour and Social Affairs Committee
- In office March 2018 – October 2021
- Preceded by: Kerstin Griese
- Succeeded by: Bernd Rützel

Member of the Bundestag; for Hamburg-Altona
- In office 22 October 2013 – 26 October 2021
- Preceded by: Ingo Egloff
- Succeeded by: Linda Heitmann

Personal details
- Born: 16 January 1959 (age 67) Bremen, West Germany
- Party: Social Democratic
- Children: 1
- Education: University of Hamburg

Matthias Bartke (born 16 January 1959) is a German politician of the Social Democratic Party of Germany (SPD) who served as a member of the German Bundestag from 2013 to 2021. From January 2016 held the position of legal advisor and thus a member of the executive board of the SPD Parliamentary Group.

== Early life and education ==
Bartke grew up in Fischerhude near Bremen. After his Abitur in 1978, he finished his military service in Rotenburg an der Wümme. He studied law in University of Hamburg (1981-1987). After that he worked as a lawyer in Altona, Hamburg. From 1987 till 1991 he was a research consultant at the Institute for Peace Research and Security Policy (IFSH) at the University of Hamburg. He holds a doctoral degree in law. He complete his PhD (Thesis: "Defence mission of the Bundeswehr: a constitutional law analysis" („Verteidigungsauftrag der Bundeswehr: eine verfassungsrechtliche Analyse“) in 1991.

== Early career ==
In 1991 Bartke entered the civil service in Hamburg. He had various executive positions at the Social Security Office of Hamburg at the department for Labour and Social affairs, Family and Integration. After the Hamburg state election of 2011, he was the office manager of Senator for Social Affairs, Detlef Scheele. From 1 January 2013 until his election as a Member of the German Bundestag Bartke was the manager of the legal department of the Social Security Office of Hamburg.

Until 2014 he was the board chairman of the Foundation Lawaetz.

== Political career ==
Bartke has been a member of the SPD since 1978. He was an active member of the Jusos and a member of the district committee of Jusos in Altona. Bartke was a member of the district assembly of Altona, Hamburg from 1986 till 1989. He was then elected as the chairman of the SPD Altona North-District. In 1996 he was elected as a member of the SPD Altona-District Executive, where he served temporarily as Chairman in 2008. Bartke was a member of the SPD-state board between 2008 and 2010. He was the founder chairman of the consortium "Selbst aktiv" for people with disabilities in SPD Hamburg.

=== Member of the German Bundestag (2013–2021) ===
Bartke first became a Member of the German Bundestag in the 2013 federal elections, after winning in the electoral district of Altona, Hamburg, with 34.9% of the first votes.

Throughout his time in parliament, Bartke served on the Committee for Labour and Social Affairs, with a main focus on labour and disability policy; he was elected chairman of the committee in March 2018. In addition, Bartke was a member of the parliament’s Council of Elders and of the Committee for the Scrutiny of Elections, Immunity and the Rules of Procedure since January 2016. From 2013 until 2017, he was also a member of the Committee on Legal Affairs and Consumer Protection, where he served as his parliamentary group’s rapporteur on human trafficking, conservatorship and cooperatives, and a substitute member of the Committee on Foreign Affairs.

In addition to his committee assignments, Bartke also served as vice-chairman of the German-Japanese Parliamentary Friendship Group. Within the SPD parliamentary group, he belonged to the Parliamentary Left, a left-wing movement.

== Other activities ==
- Sozialverband Deutschland, Member
- German United Services Trade Union (ver.di), Member
- Arbeiterwohlfahrt, Member

== Personal life ==
Bartke is married and has one son.
