= Jürgen Echternach =

German politician

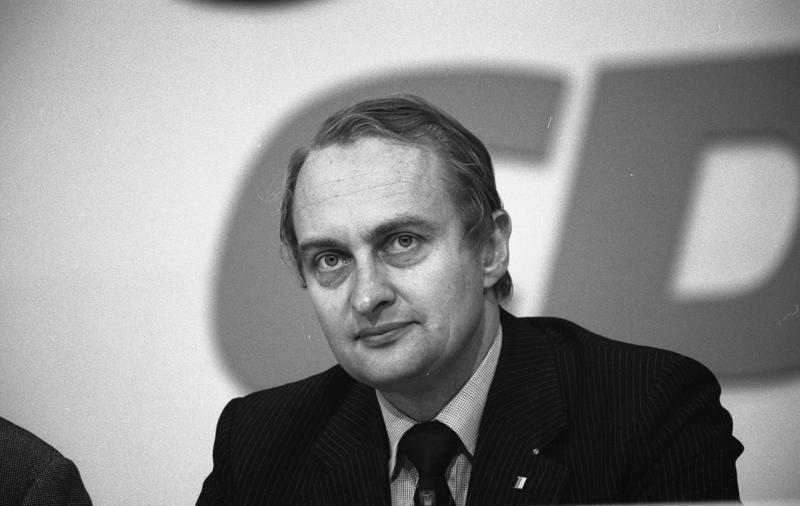
- Echternach in 1978

Member of the Bundestag; from Hamburg
- In office 4 November 1980 – 10 November 1994
- Constituency: State list (1980–1987); Hamburg-Altona (1987–1990); State list (1990–1994)

Member of the Hamburg Parliament
- In office 27 April 1966 – 5 February 1981
- Preceded by: Multi-member district
- Succeeded by: Wilfried von Danckelmann
- Constituency: State list

Personal details
- Born: Jürgen Siegmar Echternach; 1 November 1937 Lauenburg, Germany (now Lębork, Poland)
- Died: 4 April 2006 (aged 68) Hamburg, Germany
- Resting place: Nienstedten Cemetery
- Party: Christian Democratic Union
- Children: 2
- Education: Johanneum Gymnasium; University of Hamburg; University of Bonn

Jürgen Echternach (born 1 November 1937 – 4 April 2006) was a German politician, representative of the Christian Democratic Union (CDU).

From 1987 to 1993 he was Parliamentary Secretary of State for Planning, Building and Urban Development and from 1993 to 1994 he worked in the Federal Ministry of Finance. Echternach was a member of the Bundestag from 1980 to 1994, representing Hamburg-Altona from 1987 to 1990.

== See also ==
- List of German Christian Democratic Union politicians
