= Jean Cotereau =

French politician and militant secularist (1898–1979)

Libre-pensée, humanisme – France

Personal details
- Born: 27 October 1898 Millau, France
- Died: 20 April 1979 (aged 80) Millau, France
- Party: Parti radical-socialiste Camille Pelletan
- Occupation: Lawyer
- Profession: Human right activist politician

Jean Cotereau (27 October 1898 in Millau – 20 April 1979 in Millau) was a politician and a militant secularist.

== Biography ==
Coming from the middle class, he graduated from École Polytechnique.

Raised in the Catholic faith, he moved away from it to become a radical secular and anticlerical militant. He became a member of the Grand Orient of France.

He left his professional career and from 1926 he devoted himself entirely to La Libre-pensée, where he eventually became general secretary while at the same time being in charge of the association's publications, in particular La Raison ("Reason"), and L'Idée libre ("The Free Idea").

In 1950 Coterau joined the Human Rights League (France) where he was active through the 1960s.

At the same time, Jean Cotereau got involved in politics. He joined the Radical-Socialist Party Camille Pelletan, of which he was vice-president when the party was established in 1933.

However, a little later he joined the SFIO, French Section of the Workers' International, and in 1938 became a defender of the Munich Agreement.

Coterau won a municipal election in Fontenay-sous-Bois. He remained faithful to the Socialist Party although he did not achieve any position of importance in the party, until 1958 when he opposed the return to power of Charles de Gaulle.

In 1956, together with André Lorulot, he founded "La Raison", "organ of secular action and rationalist propaganda".

With La Libre pensée, where he was the president, he participated in the demonstrations of 28 May 1958. That followed by him opposing the Debré law.

In 1975 he left his directing role in La Libre pensée, but he was still named as the Honorary President.
