= Marcus Weinberg =

German politician

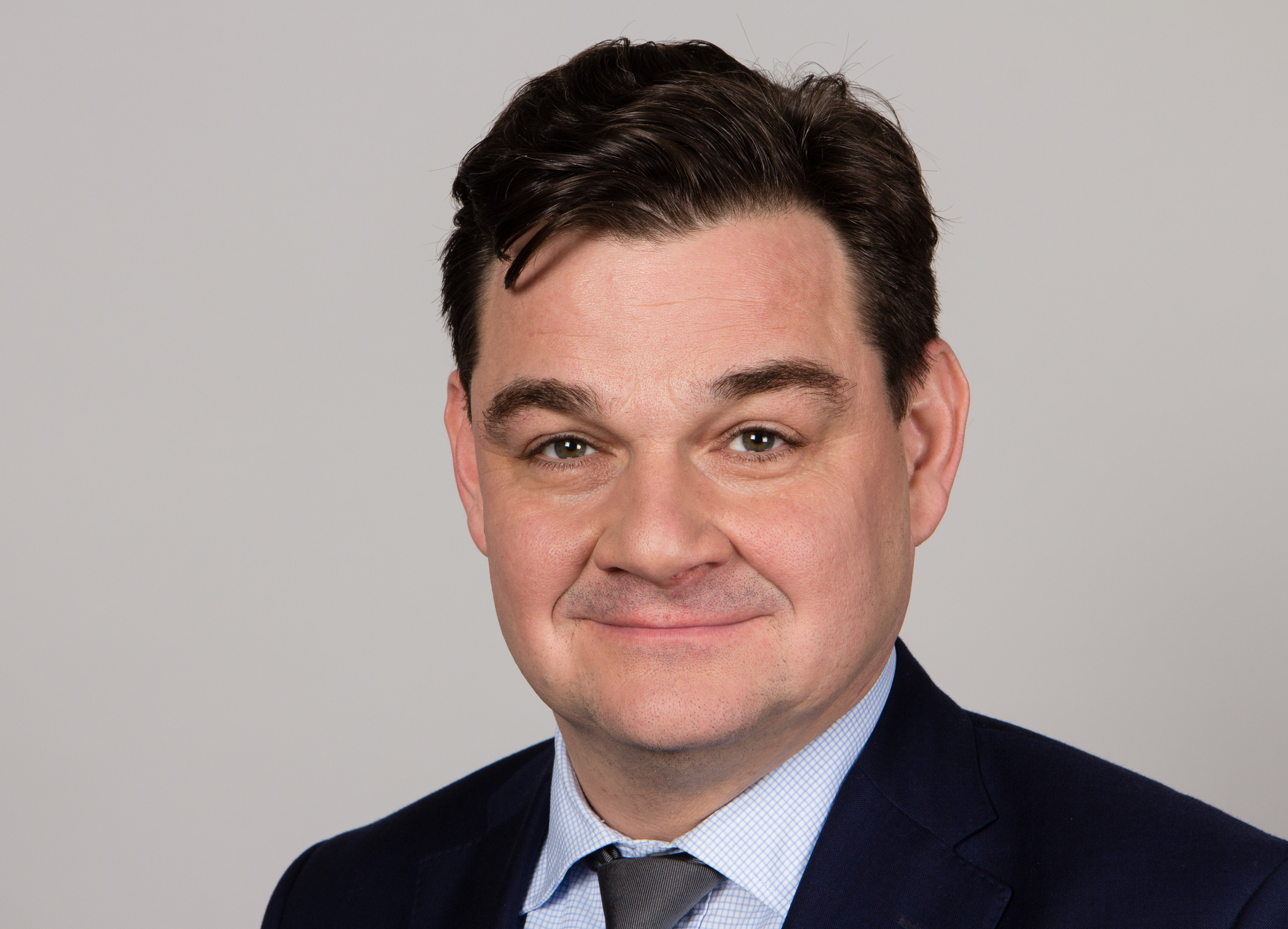
- Weinberg in 2014

Member of the Bundestag
- In office 2005–2021

Personal details
- Born: 4 June 1967 (age 59) Hamburg, West Germany (now Germany)
- Citizenship: German
- Party: CDU
- Children: 1
- Education: University of Hamburg
- Occupation: Politician

Marcus Weinberg (born 4 June 1967 in Hamburg) is a German politician who served as a member of the Bundestag from 2005 to 2021.

== Early life and career ==
After high school, Weinberg served as a Bundeswehr soldier from 1987 to 1991. Afterwards he studied history at the University of Hamburg. From 2001 to 2007 Weinberg was a teacher in Wilhelmsburg.

== Political career ==
Weinberg was a member of Hamburgische Bürgerschaft, the parliament of Hamburg, from 2001 to 2005. From 2011 to 2015 he also served as chairman of CDU Hamburg. He resigned from that position after his party scored its lowest result in history in the 2015 state elections.

Weinberg became a Member of the German Bundestag in the 2005 elections. Between 2005 and 2013, he was a member of the Committee on Education, Research and Technology Assessment. In this capacity, he was his parliamentary group's rapporteur on the validation of foreign studies and degrees. From 2009 to 2021, he served on the Committee on Family Affairs, Senior Citizens, Women and Youth.

In the negotiations to form a Grand Coalition of Chancellor Angela Merkel's Christian Democrats (CDU together with the Bavarian CSU) and the Social Democrats following the 2013 federal elections, Weinberg was part of the CDU/CSU delegation in the working group on education and research policy, led by Johanna Wanka and Doris Ahnen.

== Life after politics ==
Since 2022, Weinberg has been a partner in the Hamburg-based communications agency Guru.

== Other activities ==
- Bundesstiftung Mutter und Kind, deputy chairman of the board of trustees
- Jürgen Echternach Foundation, chairman of the board (since 2015)
- Federal Agency for Civic Education (BpB), member of the board of trustees (2006–2021)
- Frischluft e.V., member of the board of trustees (since 2005)

== Political positions ==
In June 2017, Weinberg voted against his parliamentary group's majority and in favor of Germany's introduction of same-sex marriage.

Ahead of the Christian Democrats’ leadership election in 2018, Weinberg publicly endorsed Annegret Kramp-Karrenbauer to succeed Angela Merkel as the party's chair. He later expressed support for Jens Spahn but eventually endorsed Norbert Röttgen as Kramp-Karrenbauer's successor at the party's 2021 leadership election.

== Personal life ==
Weinberg is unmarried and has one son.
