= Thomas Bird (sportsman) =

Australian sportsman

Tommy Bird
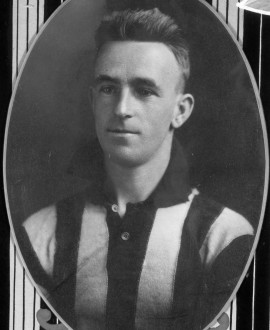
- Bird during his Collingwood career

Personal information
- Full name: Thomas Robert Bird
- Born: 31 August 1904; Collingwood, Victoria
- Died: 12 April 1979 (aged 74); Thornbury, Victoria
- Original team: Collingwood District

Playing career^{1}
Years	Club	Games (Goals)
1925, 1928	Collingwood	9 (5)
- ^{1} Playing statistics correct to the end of 1928.

Thomas Robert Bird (31 August 1904 – 12 April 1979) was an Australian sportsman who played first-class cricket for Victoria and Australian rules football with Collingwood in the Victorian Football League (VFL).

Thomas played nine games and kicked five goals for Collingwood over two VFL seasons. He debuted at Collingwood in 1925, a year when Collingwood reached the Grand Final for the first of six successive seasons. As a result of the Magpies side being so strong, Bird struggled to make the team and after his two games in 1925 didn't make another appearance with the seniors until 1928. In a premiership year for Collingwood, Thomas played seven games, including one against Carlton at Princes Park where he kicked three goals in a win. He however missed out on selection again for the finals series.

On the cricket field, Bird was a right-handed wicket-keeper batsman and played three first-class matches for Victoria in the summer of 1928–29. His debut match, against New South Wales, was his finest as he scored 63 from position eight in the batting order to help Victoria secure a draw in their second innings. The match, which took place at the Sydney Cricket Ground, is remembered for Don Bradman's innings of 340 not out, his maiden first-class triple hundred.

== See also ==
- List of Victoria first-class cricketers
