= Selma Al-Majidi =

Sudanese football coach

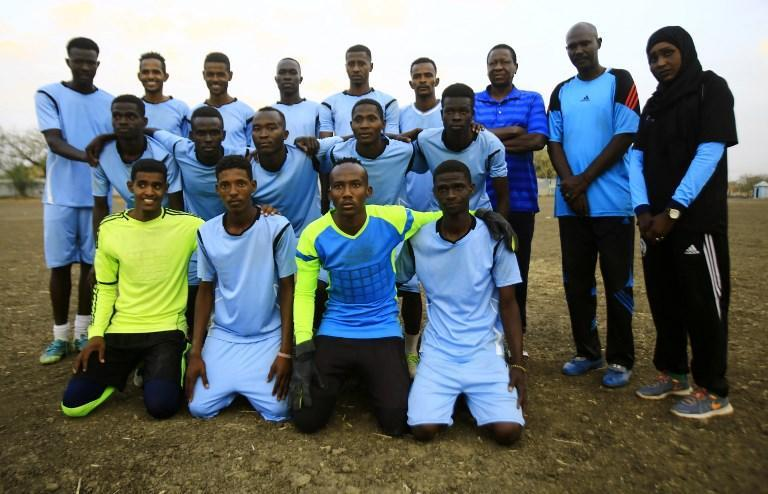

Personal information
- Date of birth: c. 1990 (age 35–36)
- Place of birth: Omdurman

Managerial career
- Years: Team
- Al Nasr (Omdurman)

Selma Al-Majidi (Arabic: سلمي الماجدي ) is the first Arab and Sudanese woman to coach a men's football team in the Arab world.

== Early life and education ==
Al-Majidi was born in 1990 in Omdurman, a Sudanese city with the two biggest football clubs. She is the daughter of a retired policeman and comes from a traditional family. Al-Majidi became interested in football at the age of 16 while watching her younger brother's football team being coached.

Al-Majidi has a degree in Accountancy and Management Studies from Al Nasr Technical College.

== Career ==
After working with her brother's coach, Al-Majidi began coaching the under-13 and under-16 teams of the Al-Hilal club in Omdurman. She has also coached Sudanese second league men's clubs, including Al-Nasr, Al-Nahda, Nile Halfa and Al-Mourada. Al-Majidi has been acknowledged by FIFA, the international football association, as the first Arab and Sudanese woman to coach a men's football team. In December 2015, she was noted in BBC Arabic's 100 inspirational women of the year.

== See also ==
Sudan women's national football team
