= Paweł Zaremba =

Paweł Zaremba (12 October 1915 in Petrograd, Russian Empire – 23 April 1979 in Munich, Germany) was a Polish historian, publicist, lawyer, radio journalist and publisher. His area of study was primarily history of Poland, history of the United States and history of the interwar period.

Zaremba was an editor of Orzeł Biały ("The White Eagle") and Pokrzywy ("Nettles"), managing director of publishing house Gryf in London, collaborator with the Parisian Kultura ("The Culture"). In 1967 he became a collaborator with Polish section of the Radio Free Europe.

He was an observer during the Spanish Civil War (1936–1939) and participant of the Invasion of Poland (1939). Until the end of World War II Zaremba stayed in the Oflag VII-A Murnau POW camp in Murnau am Staffelsee. After liberation, Zaremba joined to II Corps in Italy. In 1946 he settled in England.

== Works ==
- — (1945). W obliczu okupacji sowieckiej (in Polish). Warsaw: PPS-WRN. OCLC 122403656.
- — (1957). Historia Stanów Zjednoczonych (in Polish). Paris: Instytut Literacki. OCLC 11541652.
- — (1961). Historia Polski (in Polish). Paris: Instytut Literacki. OCLC 2094338.
- — (1981). Historia dwudziestolecia (1918-1939). Tom 1: Pierwsze lata (in Polish). Paris: Instytut Literacki. OCLC 8931940.
- — (1983). Rok 1920 (in Polish). Warsaw: Maraton. OCLC 83573668.
- — (1983). Historia dwudziestolecia (1918-1939). Tom 2: Sprawy wewnętrzne (in Polish). Warsaw: Wydawnictwo Przyszłość. OCLC 76339412.
- — (1983). Historia dwudziestolecia (1918-1939). Tom 3: Polityka zagraniczna (in Polish). Warsaw: Wydawnictwo Przyszłość. OCLC 76339418.
- — (1985). Operacja Wisła. Wojna Polsko-Bolszewicka 1918–1920 (in Polish). Solidarność Walcząca. OCLC 69491733.

== Works edited by Zaremba ==
- Zaremba, Paweł, ed. (1962). Dzieje 15 Pułku Ułanów Poznańskich (1 Pułku Ułanów Wielkopolskich) (in Polish). London: Nakładem Koła Ułanów Poznańskich. OCLC 13278318.
