= Thorleif Tharaldsen =

Norwegian footballer (1893-1979)

Personal information
- Date of birth: 15 December 1893
- Date of death: 6 April 1979 (aged 85)

International career
Years	Team	Apps	(Gls)
1915	Norway	1	(0)

Thorleif Tharaldsen (15 December 1893 – 6 April 1979) was a Norwegian footballer. He played in one match for the Norway national football team in 1915.
