= Sören Platten =

German politician (born 1988)

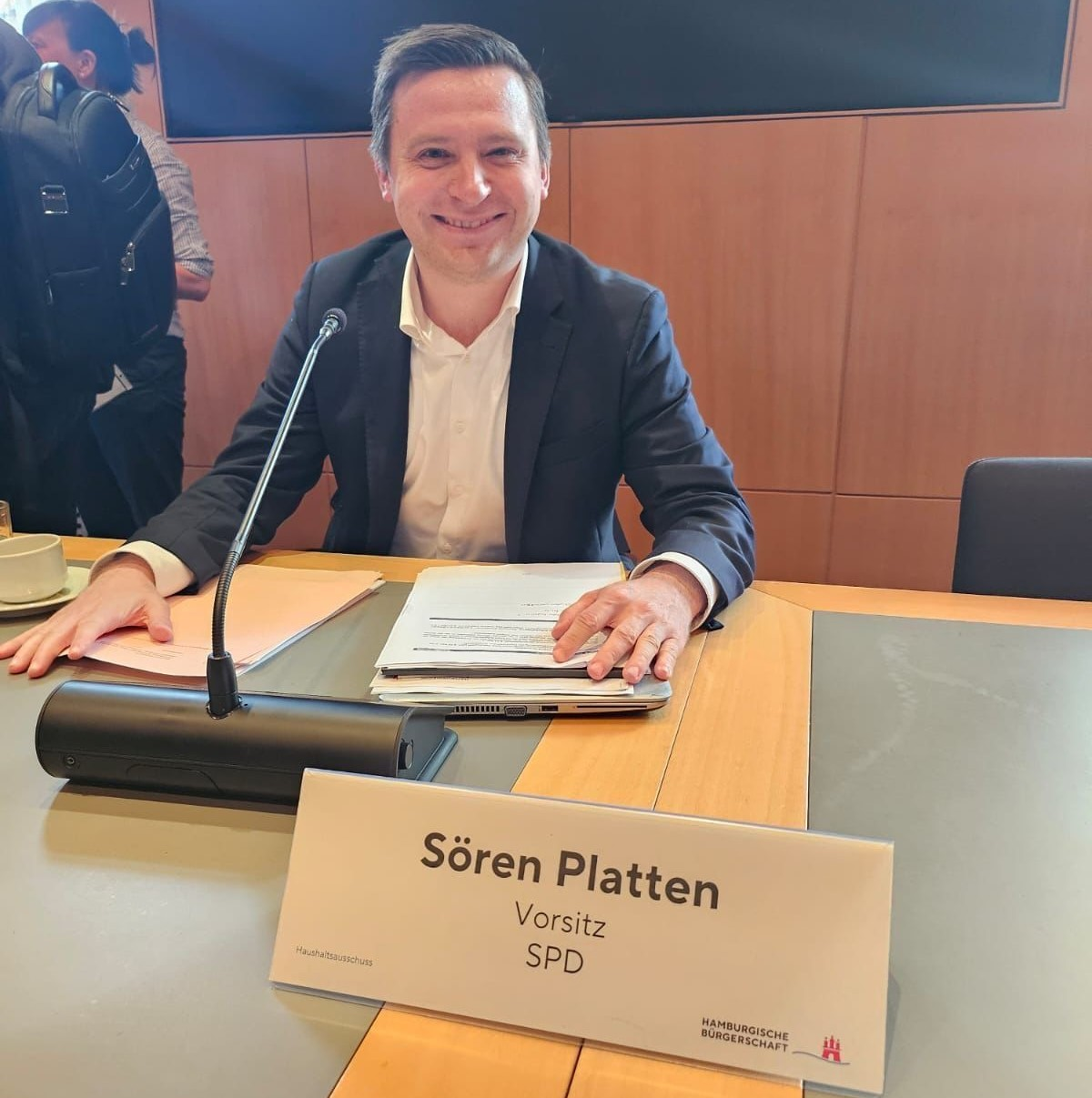
- Platten in 2025

Member of the Hamburg Parliament
- Incumbent
- Assumed office 26 March 2025

Personal details
- Born: 1988 (age 37–38)
- Party: Social Democratic Party (since 2005)

Sören Maximilian Platten (born 1988) is a German politician serving as a member of the Hamburg Parliament since 2025. He has served as chairman of the Budget Committee since 2025.
