= Nikolai Vinogradov =

Soviet navy officer and submariner (1905–1979)

- Born: Nikolai Ignatevich Vinogradov; 26 December [O.S. 13 December] 1905; Surikha, Sharyinsky District, Kostroma Governorate, Russian Empire
- Died: 27 April 1979 (aged 78) Moscow, Soviet Union
- Buried: Kuntsevo Cemetery
- Allegiance: Soviet Union
- Branch: Soviet Navy
- Service years: 1925–1968
- Rank: Admiral
- Conflicts: World War II; Winter War; Eastern Front
- Awards: Order of Lenin - twice Order of Ushakov First Class; Order of the Red Banner - five times Order of the Red Star

Nikolai Ignatevich Vinogradov (Russian: Никола́й Игна́тьевич Виногра́дов) (26 December [O.S. 13 December] 1905 – 27 April 1979) was an officer of the Soviet Navy who rose to the rank of admiral.

Born in 1905, Vinogradov joined the navy in 1925 and graduated from various naval courses to serve in staff and seagoing positions. Specialising in submarine warfare, he commanded several submarines, before taking command of a submarine brigade during the Soviet-Finnish War. By the German invasion of Russia in 1941, Vinogradov was in command of the submarine forces of the Northern Fleet. Soviet submarines scored a number of success during the war, reflecting on Vinogradov's organisational skills, and various staff appointments and promotions followed. He commanded the Kamchatka Flotilla with later postings including Chief of the Directorate of the Navy for Personnel and Naval Educational Institutions, Chief of Weapons and Shipbuilding of the Navy and Assistant Chief of the General Staff for the and Navy before his retirement in 1968.

Vinogradov died in 1979, with his memoirs posthumously published in 1989. His awards included two Orders of Lenin, five Orders of the Red Banner, the Order of Ushakov First Class and the Order of the Red Star. Among the tributes he received after his death was the naming of the Udaloy-class destroyer Admiral Vinogradov.

== Early career ==
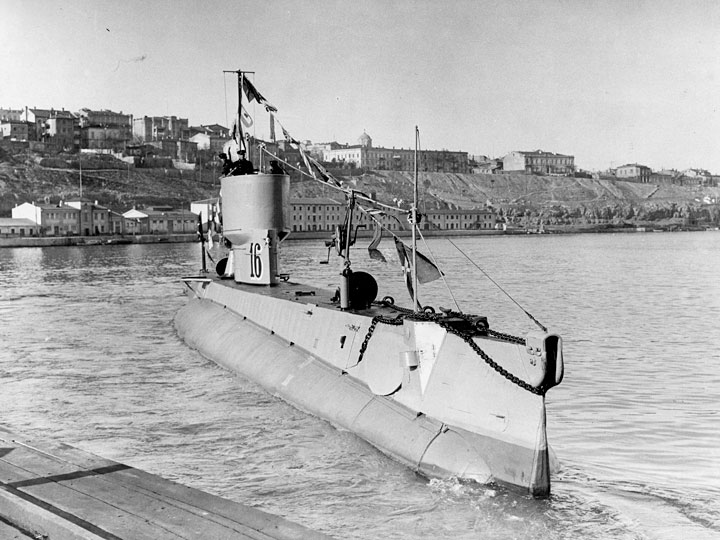
The submarine Metallist in Sevastopol in the early 1930s. Vinogradov served on her in 1931 as navigator.

Vinogradov was born on 26 December [O.S. 13 December] 1905 in the village of Surikha, located in the present-day Sharyinsky District of Kostroma Oblast. His father was a sailor in the Baltic Fleet of the Imperial Russian Navy, and Nikolai Vinogradov joined the Soviet Navy in 1925, graduating from the M.V. Frunze Naval School in Leningrad in 1930. He took command courses for submarine training in 1932, and graduated from the Naval Academy in 1939. He had been a member of the Communist Party since 1930.

From 1930 to 1931 he served in the Black Sea Fleet with a posting as flag-secretary to the Fleet commander, followed by service as navigator of the submarine Metallist in 1931. Vinogradov became commander of the M-1 between 1933 and 1935, during which time the submarine was redeployed from Black Sea to the Pacific Fleet. He then served as commander of the submarine Shch-121 between 1935 and 1936.

== Wartime service ==
In 1939 Vinogradov became chief of staff of the 3rd Submarine Brigade of the Baltic Fleet, and later that year the brigade's commander until 1940. During this time the brigade saw action during the Soviet-Finnish War. From here he moved in December 1940 to take command of the Northern Fleet's submarine brigade, a post he held during the German invasion of the Soviet Union. He was promoted to rear-admiral on 3 January 1942 and became head of the fleet's submarine operations in 1943. The fleet's submarines destroyed or damaged 108 enemy ships during Vinogradov's tenure, with five awarded the Order of the Red Banner, and four receiving the title of "Guards". Five of his captains, I. A. Kolyshkin, N. A. Lunin, V. G. Starikov, I. I. Fisanovich and M. I. Gadzhiyev, were the first Soviet submariners of the Second World War to receive the title of Hero of the Soviet Union.

Vinogradov became deputy to the head of the navy's submarine directorate from 1943 until 1945.^{[a]} In March 1945, towards the end of the war, he became commander of the South-Western Marine Defence Region of the Baltic Fleet, with a promotion to vice-admiral on 20 April 1945, and then Chief of Staff of the Southern Baltic Fleet in 1946.

== Postwar career ==
Vinogradov was appointed commander of the Kamchatka Flotilla in 1946, followed by a posting as Deputy Chief of the Main Naval Staff from 1948 until 1950. In 1950 he became Deputy Secretary of the Navy for Personnel and Naval Educational Institutions, and in 1953 Chief of Weapons and Shipbuilding of the Navy. On 31 May 1954 he was promoted to admiral, and in 1958 he took the post of Deputy Chief of the General Staff of the Army and Navy, followed by Assistant Chief of the General Staff for the Navy in 1961. His final post was in 1962 as Head of the Administration of Naval Educational Institutions, which he held until his retirement in 1968.

== Legacy ==
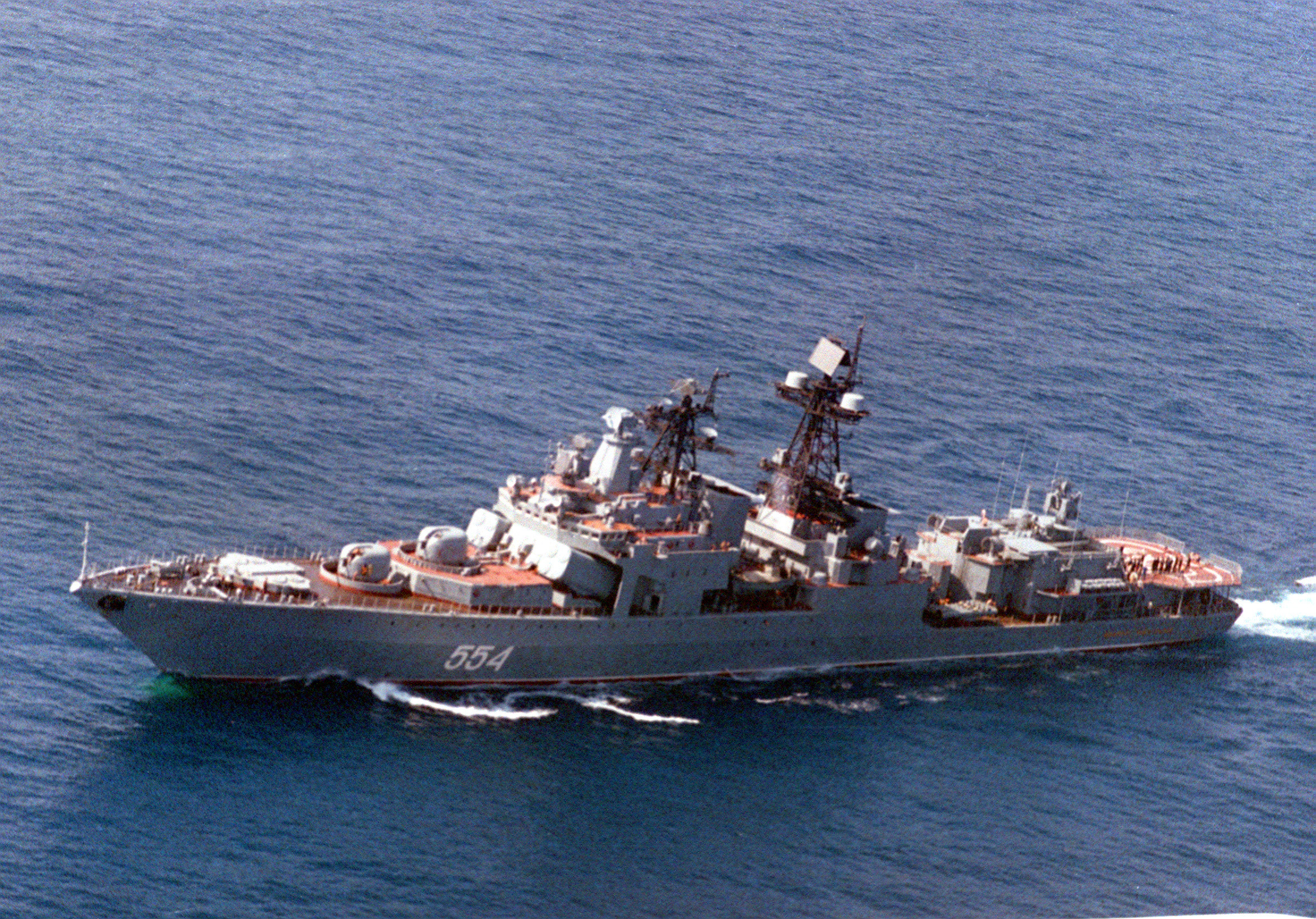
Vinogradov's namesake, the Udaloy-class destroyer Admiral Vinogradov, underway in 1992

During his long naval career Vinogradov was awarded two Orders of Lenin, five Orders of the Red Banner, the Order of Ushakov First Class, the Order of the Red Star, and numerous medals and foreign awards. Vinogradov died on 27 April 1979 and was buried at Kuntsevo Cemetery. His memoirs, The Underwater Front (Russian: Подводный фронт, Podvodnyi front), were published in Moscow in 1989. Vinogradov was honoured with the naming of the Udaloy-class destroyer Admiral Vinogradov, which joined the Pacific Fleet in 1989. A street in Sharya is named after him, and a memorial plaque is located in the school in the Sharyinsky District where he studied. Recalling his wartime relationship with Vinogradov, Admiral Arseniy Golovko, commander of the Northern Fleet from 1940 to 1945, noted that “During the whole period of war, while N. I. Vinogradov was the brigade commander, he correctly supervised the training of submarine crews, and especially their commanders ... I must say that Vinogradov and I understood each other well.”

== Notes ==
a. It was during this time, in December 1944, that Vinogradov met fellow submarine officer, and future admiral of the fleet, Georgiy Yegorov, then serving in the Baltic as captain of M-90. Yegorov recalled the meeting when contributing a biographical sketch for Vinogradov's memoirs, Podvodnyi front.
