= Harold Everett =

English cricketer and civil servant

Personal information
- Full name: Harold Everett
- Born: 13 November 1891; Kennington, Surrey, England
- Died: 27 April 1979 (aged 87); East Preston, West Sussex, England
- Batting: Right-handed
- Bowling: Right-arm slow-medium

Career statistics
Competition	First-class
Matches	1
Runs scored	2
Batting average	1.00
100s/50s	0/0
Top score	2
Balls bowled	48
Wickets	0
Bowling average	–
5 wickets in innings	0
10 wickets in match	0
Best bowling	–
Catches/stumpings	0/–
- Source: Cricinfo, 17 February 2019

Harold Everett (13 November 1891 – 27 April 1979) was an English first-class cricketer and civil servant.

Everett was born at Kennington. He represented the Civil Service cricket team in its only appearance in first-class cricket against the touring New Zealanders at Chiswick in 1927. Batting twice during the match, he scored 2 runs in the Civil Service first-innings before being dismissed by Roger Blunt, while in their second-innings he was dismissed without scoring by Matt Henderson. He bowled eight wicketless overs in the New Zealanders only innings, conceding 34 runs.

He died at East Preston, West Sussex in April 1979.
