= Jean-Albert Brasu =

French equestrian

Jean-Albert Brau
Personal information
- Nationality: French
- Born: 28 May 1898
- Died: 12 April 1979 (aged 80)

Sport
- Sport: Equestrian

Jean-Albert Brau (28 May 1898 – 12 April 1979) was a French equestrian. He competed in two events at the 1956 Summer Olympics.
