= Leslie Phillips (cricketer) =

English cricketer (1899–1979)

Personal information
- Full name: Leslie Jack Phillips
- Born: 20 January 1899; Leyton, Essex, England
- Died: 22 April 1979 (aged 80); Woodford Wells, Essex, England
- Batting: Right-handed
- Bowling: Slow left-arm orthodox

Domestic team information
- Years: Team
- 1919–1922: Essex

Career statistics
Competition	First-class
Matches	4
Runs scored	38
Batting average	9.50
100s/50s	–/–
Top score	19
Balls bowled	26
Wickets	–
Bowling average	–
5 wickets in innings	–
10 wickets in match	–
Best bowling	–
Catches/stumpings	–/–
- Source: Cricinfo, 27 October 2011

Leslie Jack Phillips (20 January 1899 – 22 April 1979) was an English cricketer. Phillips was a right-handed batsman who bowled slow left-arm orthodox. He was born at Leyton, Essex.

Phillips made his first-class debut for Essex against Surrey in the 1919 County Championship. He made three further first-class appearances for the county, the last of which came against Dublin University in 1922. He scored a total of 38 runs in these four matches at an average of 9.50, with a high score of 19.

He died at Woodford Wells, Essex on 22 April 1979.
