= Jerry Butler (Texas politician) =

American politician

Member of the Texas House of Representatives from the 58th district
- In office January 13, 1959 – January 12, 1965
- Preceded by: Ligon L. Holstein
- Succeeded by: Wayne Connally

Personal details
- Born: January 9, 1929 Falls City, Texas, U.S.
- Died: April 7, 1979 (aged 50) Travis County, Texas, U.S.
- Party: Democratic
- Profession: rancher, lawyer

Gerald Duane Butler (January 9, 1929 – April 7, 1979) was an American politician. He served as a Democratic member in the Texas House of Representatives from 1959 to 1965.
