= Mohammad Taghi Majidi =

Iranian general (1911–1979)

Timsar Mohammad Taghi Majidi
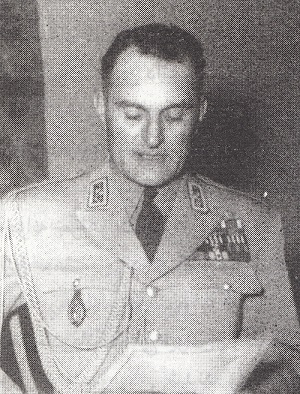
- Born: 26 November 1911; Rasht, Qajar Iran
- Died: 11 April 1979 (aged 67) Tehran, Iran
- Allegiance: Pahlavi Iran
- Branch: Imperial Army of Iran
- Service years: 1932–1966
- Rank: Lieutenant-General

Mohammad Taghi Majidi (Persian: محمدتقی مجیدی; 26 November 1911 – 11 April 1979) was an Iranian Lieutenant-General and military leader.

== History ==
Majidi was born in Rasht on 26 November 1911 and came to Tehran after completing his secondary education there, where he entered the officer's college. He graduated from this college in 1932.

Majidi pursued a military career in the ground forces and infantry, and in 1946 he achieved the rank of colonel and became the commander of the infantry brigade of the officer's college. After that, in 1950, he was appointed to the command of the Zahedan Brigade, and after the 1953 Iranian coup d'état he held the rank of brigadier general. After some time, he was transferred to Tehran and became the commander of the Central Infantry Division.

Majidi was later appointed head of the military courts against the Tudeh Party's network of officers and issued death sentences for these officers during three terms of the military court of first instance. Following the assassination attempt on Hossein Ala' by members of the Fadaiyan-e-Islam and the arrest of members of this group, General Majidi presided over the relevant court and issued a death sentence for Nawab Safavid.

In 1957, he was promoted to the rank of major general and appointed commander of the Persian National Guard Corps. After receiving the rank of lieutenant general (Sepahbod), he was appointed to the command of the Central Corps. General Majidi retired in 1966.

== After the revolution ==
General Majidi was arrested and executed after the Revolution of 1979 due to the Navab Safavid of Military Court and the issuance of a death sentence for him and Majidi was executed on the evening of 11 April 1979.
