= Ralph Cruddas =

British Army general

Major-General Ralph Cruddas CB DSO
- Born: Ralph Cyril Cruddas; 26 August 1900; Withiel, Cornwall, England
- Died: 29 April 1979 (aged 78); Frome, Somerset, England
- Military career
- Allegiance: United Kingdom
- Branch: British Army
- Rank: Major-General
- Commands: 7th Bn Oxfordshire and Buckinghamshire Light Infantry; Cyrenaica District; 133rd Infantry Brigade; Land Forces in Hong Kong
- Conflicts: World War II
- Awards: Companion of the Order of the Bath; Distinguished Service Order

Major-General Ralph Cyril Cruddas CB DSO (26 August 1900 – 29 April 1979) was Commander of British Forces in Hong Kong.

== Military career ==
Cruddas was commissioned into the Duke of Cornwall's Light Infantry in 1919. He was appointed private secretary to the Governor of Assam in India 1933.

He served in World War II being appointed commanding officer of 7th Bn Oxfordshire and Buckinghamshire Light Infantry in 1941. After the War he became commander of the Cyrenaica District of Libya. In 1949, he became commander of 133rd Infantry Brigade and in 1951 he was made commander of land forces in Hong Kong; he was appointed a Companion of the Order of the Bath in June 1953 and retired in 1955.
