= Hugo Scharnberg =

German politician

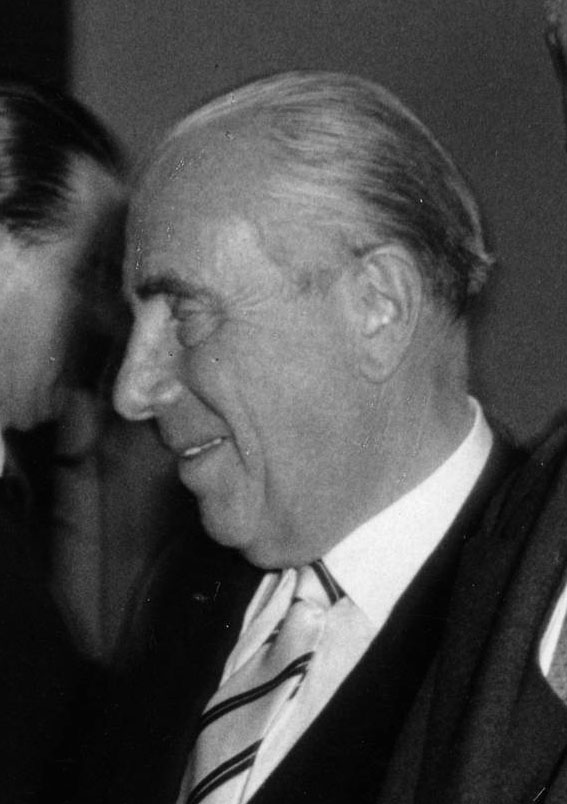
- Scharnberg in 1957

Member of the Bundestag; from Hamburg
- In office 7 September 1949 – 17 October 1961
- Preceded by: Constituency established
- Succeeded by: Multi-member district
- Constituency: Hamburg II (1949–1957); State list (1957–1961)

Personal details
- Born: 28 June 1893 Hamburg, Germany
- Died: 30 April 1979 (aged 85) Lugano, Switzerland
- Party: Christian Democratic Union

Hugo Scharnberg (28 June 1893 – 30 April 1979) was a German politician of the Christian Democratic Union (CDU) and former member of the German Bundestag.

== Political career ==
He served in the German Bundestag from its inception in 1949 until 1961 and, as a member of parliament elected in 1953 with more than 55% of the initial votes, he represented Hamburg II in the first two parliamentary sessions. He was elected to the Bundestag in 1957 using the Hamburg state list.

== Literature ==
Herbst, Ludolf; Jahn, Bruno (2002). Vierhaus, Rudolf (ed.). Biographisches Handbuch der Mitglieder des Deutschen Bundestages. 1949–2002 [Biographical Handbook of the Members of the German Bundestag. 1949–2002] (in German). München: De Gruyter - De Gruyter Saur. p. 1715. ISBN 978-3-11-184511-1.
