= East Karelian uprising =

1921-1922 rebellion in East Karelia

- Part of the Heimosodat
- Karelian and Finnish soldiers fighting against Russian Bolsheviks, 9 January 1922
Date	6 November 1921 – 21 March 1922
Location	East Karelia
Result	Soviet victory: End of the Heimosodat

Belligerents
Karelian United Government; Metsäsissit; Supported by: Finland; White Guard; Jaeger Movement	Russian SFSR; Karelian Labor Commune

Commanders and leaders
Ukki Väinämöinen; Ossippa Borissainen; Jalmari Takkinen	Alexander Sedyakin; Sergey Kamenev

Strength
3,050	13,000

Casualties and losses
Unknown	352 killed, 1,042 wounded, sick or injured

The East Karelian Uprising (Finnish: itäkarjalaisten kansannousu, Karelian: päivännouzu karjalan kanzannouzu) and the Soviet–Finnish conflict 1921–1922 were an attempt by a group of East Karelian separatists supported by Finland to gain independence from the Russian Soviet Federative Socialist Republic. They were aided by a number of Finnish volunteers, starting from 6 November 1921. The conflict ended on 21 March 1922 with the Agreements between the governments of Soviet Russia and Finland about the measures of maintenance of the inviolability of the Soviet–Finnish border. The conflict is regarded in Finland as one of the heimosodat – "Kinship Wars".

== Background ==
After Finland declared independence from Russia, a number of Finnish nationalists supported the idea of a Greater Finland attained through the annexation of East Karelia, which was controlled by the Russians. This was seen as an effort to form a unified country for Balto-Finnic tribes, who were regarded as kindred by these activists. The resulting two incursions by Finnish volunteers into Russia, called the Viena and Aunus expeditions, are not considered wars against Russia in Finnish historiography. In Russia, this conflict, as well as the Finnish expeditions into East Karelia and the Petsamo in 1918–1920, is considered a military intervention and called the First Soviet–Finnish War. This period of disagreement and uncertainty about borders was ended with the Treaty of Tartu, where Finland and the Baltic states first recognised the Russian Soviet Federative Socialist Republic as a sovereign state, and established the border between Finland and RSFSR.

According to Arvo Tuominen, the Soviet Union failed to grant autonomy to Karelia as the peace treaty stipulated. "In that failure the Soviet Union did not adhere to its own Leninist policies of national self-determination, for according to them Karelia had every right to independence. At the Bolshevik's All-Russian Party Congress in February 1917 it had clearly been stated, 'All peoples who belong to Russia must be granted the right to free secession and the formation of an independent state'."

The motivation for the uprising was East Karelians' year-long experience of the Bolshevik regime – not respecting promises of autonomy, food shortages, the will of nationalistic kindred activists to amend the results of the "shameful peace" of Tartu, and the wish of exiled East Karelians. Finnish kindred activists, notably Jalmari Takkinen, the deputy of Bobi Sivén, the bailiff of Repola, had been conducting a campaign in the summer of 1921 in order to rouse the East Karelians to fight against the Bolshevik belligerents of the ongoing Russian Civil War. East Karelian paramilitary units called themselves Karjalan metsäsissit (English: Forest Guerrillas), and by autumn of 1921 a notable part of White Karelia was under their control.

=== Before the Treaty of Tartu ===
The parishes of Repola and Porajärvi of the Olonets Governorate had voted in favor of secession from Bolshevist Russia and had been occupied by Finland later that year. In late 1919 the Russian White Army retreated towards the Finnish border to the Repola-Porajärvi area. The Finnish government led by Juho Vennola decided in February 1920 that Finland should intervene to help the dissidents by diplomatic means. Foreign minister Rudolf Holsti sent a message to his counterpart Georgy Chicherin stating that Finland would disarm the retreating Russian White troops if the Red Army does not occupy the parishes. Agreement was honoured by both parties, although there were minor skirmishes between Finnish troops and the Red Army. These fights led to armistice negotiations in Rajajoki, which ended unsuccessfully after two weeks.

There had been uprisings in White Karelia as early as 1920. After British forces left Karelia, Karelian ethnic nationalists arranged a meeting in Ukhta (now Kalevala, Russia) in March–April 1920 where they elected 117 representatives. In the meeting they decided that White Karelia should become an independent nation. Some parishes of Olonets Karelia joined in and the Väliaikainen toimikunta (Temporary Commission) renamed itself to Karjalan väliaikainen hallitus (Temporary Government of Karelia). However, the Red Army suppressed this uprising and in summer 1920 the Temporary Government fled to Finland. In its place, the Karelian Worker's Commune was formed, an autonomous oblast of the RSFSR.

During the treaty negotiations, Finland proposed a referendum in East Karelia, through which its residents could choose whether they wanted to join Finland or Soviet Russia. Due to opposition from Russia, Finland had to withdraw the initiative. In return of ceding Repola and Porajärvi back to Russia, Finland acquired Petsamo and a promise of cultural autonomy for East Karelia. However this cultural autonomy was poorly carried out.

== Preparations ==
Following the signing of the treaty, irredentists of the Repola county devised a contingency plan with the silent approval of the Finnish ministry of foreign affairs, titled Karhunpesäsuunnitelma (Project Bear's Den). They acquired a shipment of 500 Japanese rifles and 100 000 cartridges from Elmo Kaila, one of the Jäger Movement leaders. They also had two Maxim machine guns and four Lewis Guns. Weapons shipments for Project Bear's Den were an open secret and overlooked by Finnish customs officials.

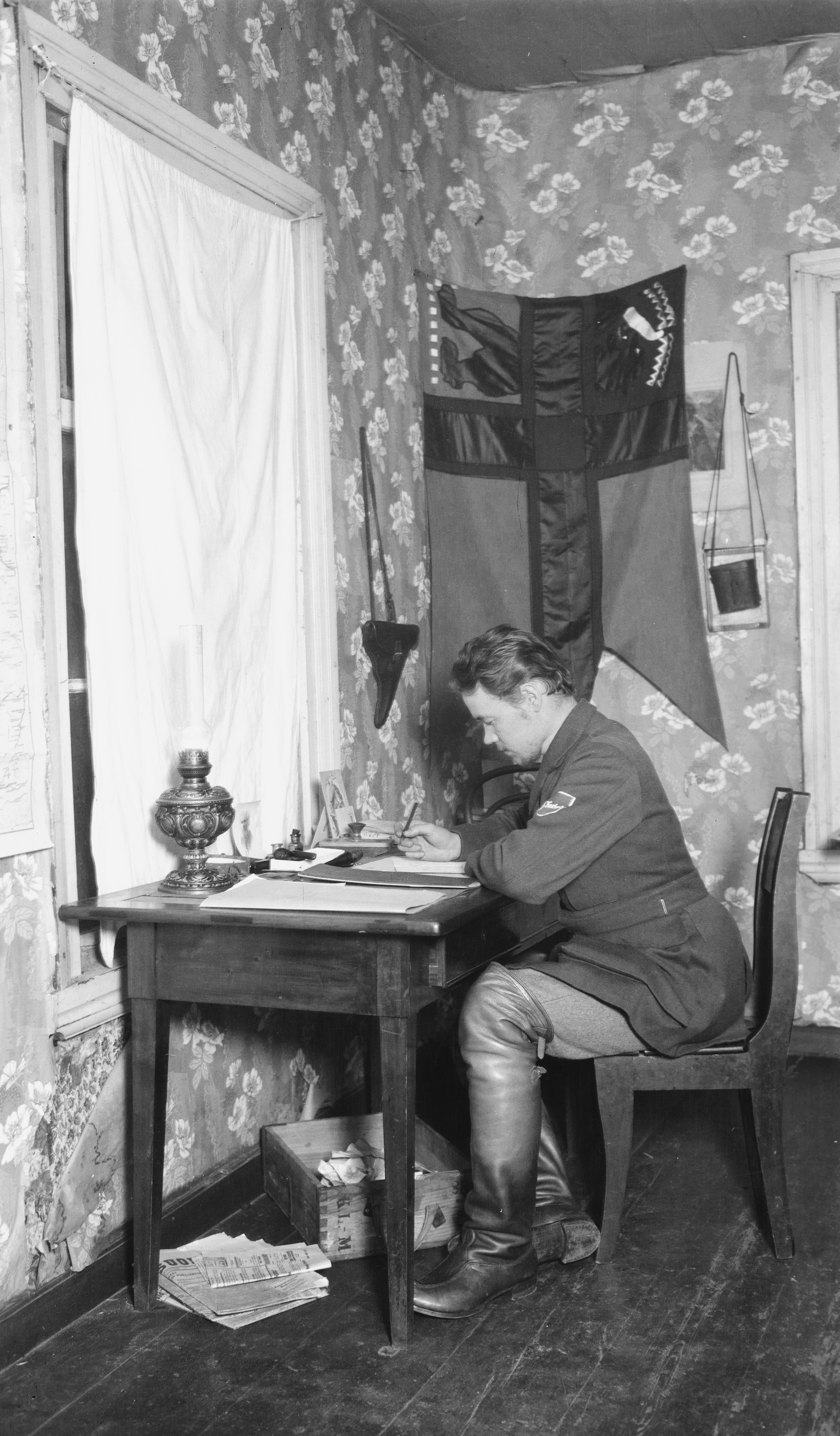
Jalmari Takkinen, the commander-in-chief of the uprising.

On 6 January 1921, an aide of the Finnish minister of foreign affairs Rudolf Holsti demanded an official account for the weapons. Eventually, the leader of the Repola irredentists, Bobi Sivén, received a letter from the Finnish foreign ministry stating: "Due to extraordinary circumstances you must do your utmost to prevent the people of Repola and Porajärvi from arming themselves." On 12 January, Sivén committed suicide with his service pistol. In several suicide letters he left behind, he expressed his resentment at Finland "betraying" the East Karelians, and his wish to rather die for East Karelians than return to Finland. He had answered earlier requests from Finnish government to return to Finland by stating he resigns from his bailiff office, and prefers to live as a civilian in Repola. Due to succeeding events Sivén was elevated to a status of a minor Finnic national hero and martyr akin to Eugen Schauman, whose method of suicide he also imitated either on purpose or coincidentally, shooting himself in the heart instead of head in addition to the similar nationalistic pathos letters. Gradually these early uprisings and Finnish government's interest in supporting them dwindled.

== The uprising ==
The pivotal moment in the uprising was the council meeting of Karelian Forest Guerrillas in mid-October 1921. It voted in favor of secession from Soviet Russia. The key leadership was formed by military leaders Jalmari Takkinen, Finnish-born, aka. Ilmarinen, and Ossippa Borissainen. Particularly Vaseli Levonen aka. Ukki Väinämöinen, who had prominent Karelian features and general resemblance to the Finnish mythical character, was deemed suitable for his role as an ideological leader. Some 550 Finnish volunteers joined the uprising, acting mostly as officers and squad leaders. Most famous of them was Paavo Talvela and Erik Heinrichs of the Jäger Movement, who later served as high ranking staff officer in the Winter War and Continuation War.

The uprising is a peculiarity among heimosodat as this time the initiative was not taken by Finnish insurgents, but by East Karelian separatists, and Finnish government remaining officially passive. After the treaty of Tartu and Finnish government retreating from covert separatist support, the uprising was started by East Karelians, with Finnish volunteers joining afterwards. The uprising began with the immediate summary execution of anyone who was or was suspected to be a Bolshevik. The uprising escalated into a military engagement in October–November 1921. The 2,500 Forest Guerrillas were initially fairly successful, despite their lack of proper equipment.

The East Karelian rebels got some publicity in international media, but they had expected Finland to intervene with its defence forces. However, the Finnish government denied requests of arranging official enlistment, but it did not prevent private Finnish volunteer activists from crossing the border. Finland did agree to send humanitarian aid to the East Karelian rebels, taking the risk of provoking a war with the RSFSR. Soviet historians, however, stipulated that the Finnish government did support the uprising in a military manner, and was intervening in an internal conflict.

In Northern White Karelia the smaller Vienan Rykmentti (Viena Regiment) was formed. Combined, the East Karelian rebels numbered 2,500.

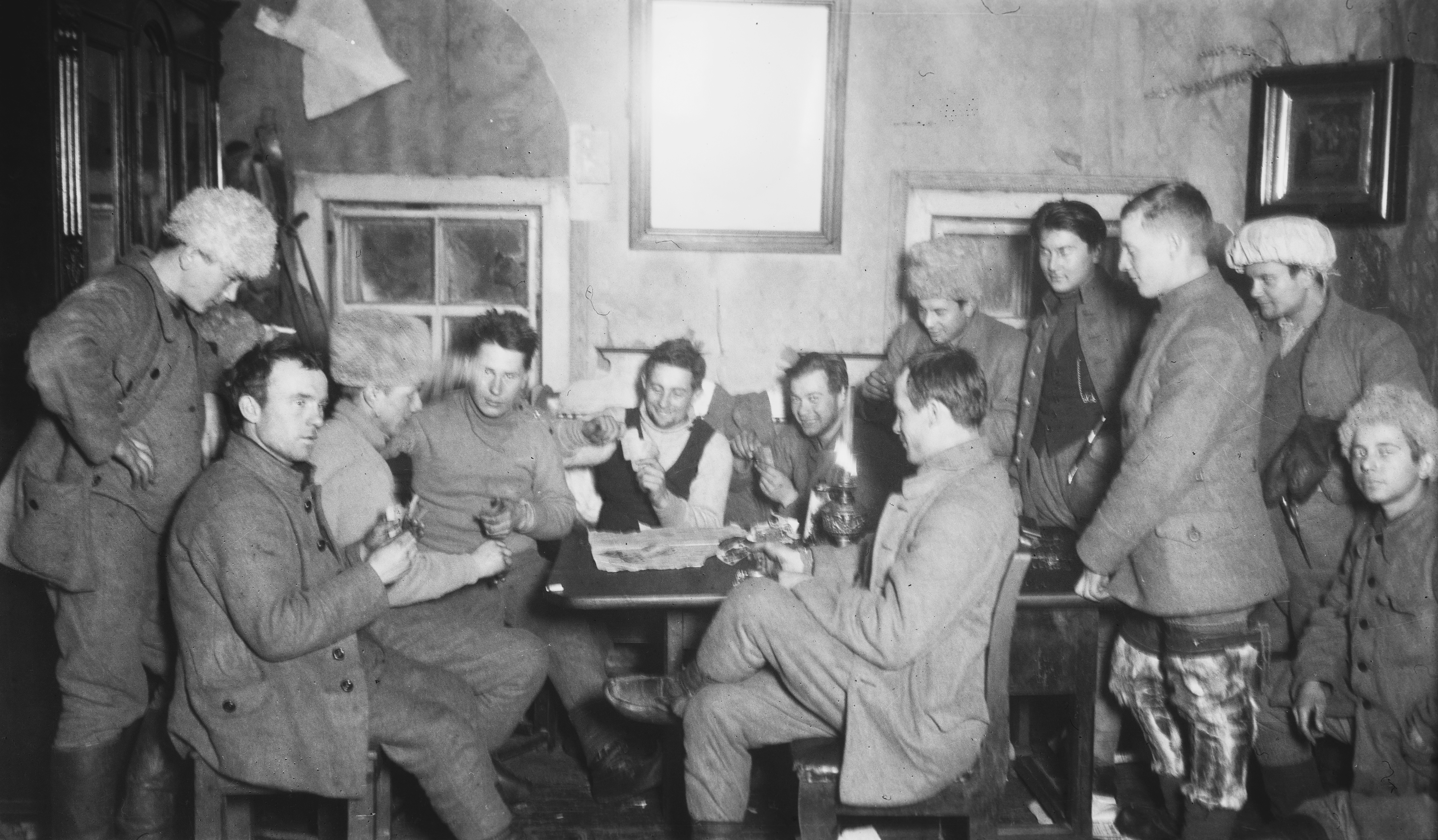
Finnish volunteer fighters at Tšolma (Tšelmozero)

On 6 November 1921, the Finnish and Karelian forces began a new incursion into East Karelia. According to Finnish historians, on that day Karelian guerrillas and Finnish volunteer forces attacked in Rukajärvi. Russian historian Alexander Shirokorad claims this force was 5,000–6,000 strong, which is twice the total strength of East Karelians and Finnish volunteers combined according to Finnish records.

The first Finnish volunteers reached Repola at the end of November 1921. The volunteers acted as private citizens and were not considered a government intervention by Finland, but the Russian view differed. This controversy caused considerable friction in diplomatic relations between Finland and RSFSR. Most of the volunteers joined the Repolan Pataljoona (Repola Battalion). Command of the Battalion in Olonets Karelia was first taken by Gustaf Svinhufvud and thereafter by Talvela, at the middle of December 1921.

By the end of December 1921, the Finnish volunteers and Karelian Forest Guerrillas had advanced to the Kestenga Suomussalmi – Rugozero – Padany – Porosozero lines. Meanwhile, the ca. 20 000 troops of the Red Army led by Alexander Sedyakin have reached Karelia and mounted a counterattack. The Red Army also had Red Finns within its ranks. These Finns had emigrated to Soviet Russia after their defeat in the Finnish Civil War. One such unit was a ski battalion of 200 Red military school cadets under the command of Toivo Antikainen.

== Defeat of the uprising ==
Finnish support of the uprising with volunteers and humanitarian aid caused a notable regression on Finnish-Russian diplomatic relations. Leon Trotsky, the commander of the Red Army, announced that he was ready to march towards Helsinki and Soviet Russian troops would strike the East Karelian rebels with an army of 20,000 via the Murmansk railway.

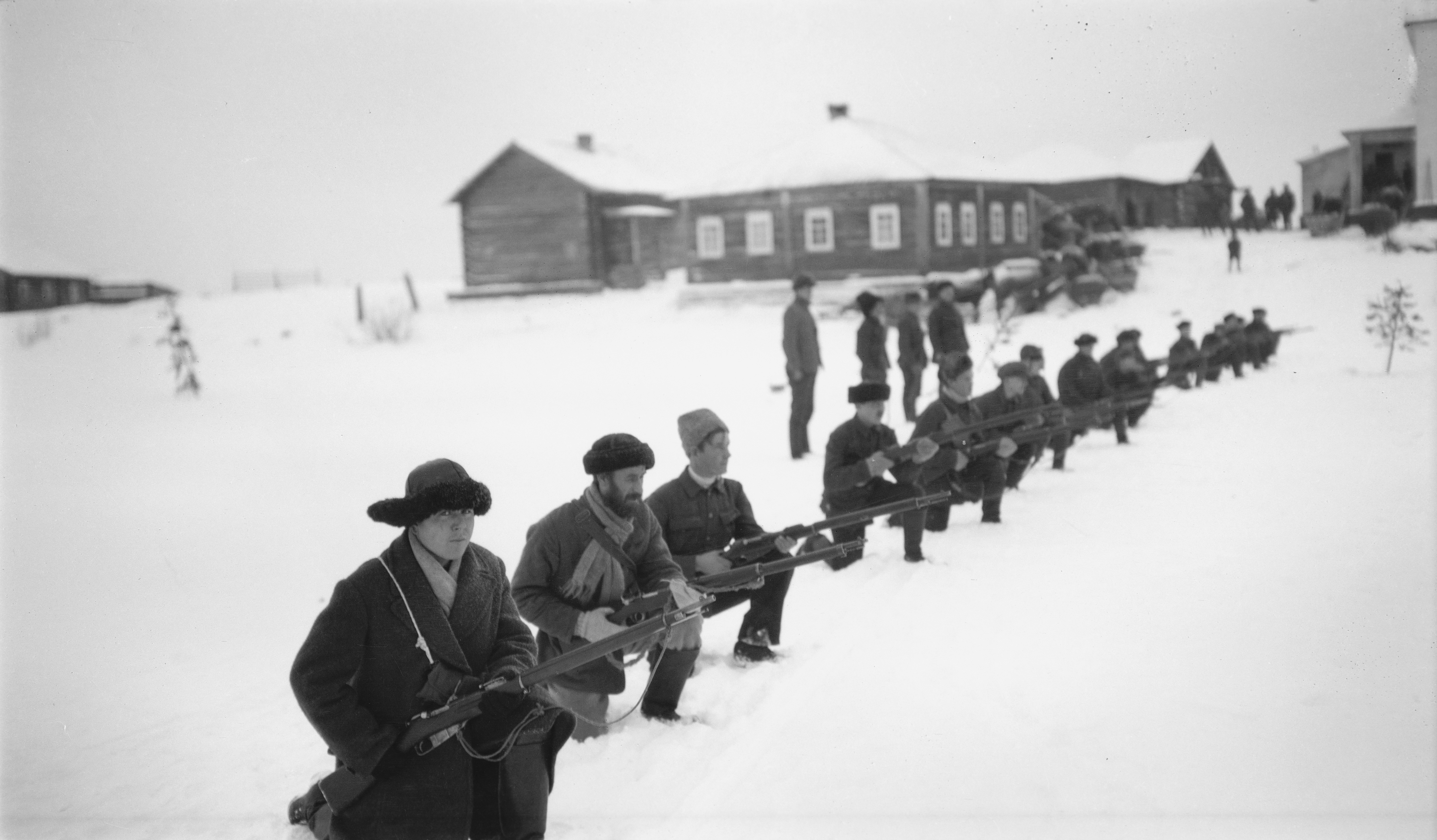
Finnish volunteers training at Kiimasjärvi

At the onset of winter, the resistance of Forest Guerrillas collapsed under superior numbers of the Red Army, famine, and freezing cold. The rebels panicked, and their troops started to retreat towards the Finnish border. According to Shirokorad, the troops of the Red Army had crushed the main group of the Finnish and Karelian troops by the beginning of January 1922 and had retaken Porosozero and Reboly. On 25 January the northern group of the Soviet troops had occupied Kestenga and Kokkosalmi, and by the beginning of February occupied the settlement Ukhta.

Map of the uprising and the following Soviet counteroffensive

During the final stages of the uprising, the Red "Pork mutiny" occurred in Finland, sparking a hope among the rebels and Finnish volunteers that this would cause the Finnish government to intervene and provide military aid to the insurgents. This did not happen; on the contrary, the minister of interior, Heikki Ritavuori, tightened border control, closed the border preventing food and munitions shipments, and prohibited volunteers to cross over to join the uprising. The assassination of Ritavuori on February 12, 1922, by a Finnish nationalist activist did not change the situation.

The last unit of the uprising, remnants of Viena Regiment, fled Tiirovaara on 16 February 1922, at 10:45 am and reached the border at 1 pm.

== Aftermath ==
On 1 June 1922, in Helsinki, Finland and Soviet Russia signed an Agreement between RSFSR and Finland about the measures providing the inviolability of the Soviet–Finnish border. Both parties agreed to reduce the number of border guards and to keep those who do not reside permanently in the border zone from freely crossing the border from either side to the other. Towards the end of the uprising some 30 000 East Karelian refugees evacuated to Finland.

The Karelian Worker's Commune was renamed into the Karelian Autonomous Soviet Socialist Republic in 1923, and its autonomy was further expanded. However the cultural autonomy practically ended in 1933–1935 when the émigré Finnish leaders Edvard Gylling and Kustaa Rovio were purged and teaching of Finnish language was prohibited. Gylling had promoted the adoption of Finnish rather than Karelian within the KASSR as he and the other émigré Finns who dominated the leadership of Karelia before 1935 did not consider Karelian to be anything more than a rustic dialect of Finnish. It may also be argued they held the same view of the essential unity of the Karelians and Finns as one Finnic people as their nationalist counterparts, and also wished that they be unified (albeit in rather different political circumstances).

== Sources ==
- Niinistö, Jussi. Heimosotien historia. Suomalaisen Kirjallisuuden Seura, 2005, ISBN 951-746-687-0
- Shirokorad. Alexander. Finland – Russia. Three unknown wars (Финляндия - Россия. Три неизвестные войны), 2006, ISBN 5-9533-1084-6 (in Russian)

== See also ==
- Bibliography of the Russian Revolution and Civil War
- Outline of the Russian Revolution and Civil War
- Index of articles related to the Russian Revolution and Civil War
- The "Russian" Civil Wars, 1916–1926: Ten Years That Shook the World
- Russia in Flames: War, Revolution, Civil War, 1914–1921
- Russia in Revolution: An Empire in Crisis, 1890 to 1928
- Russia: Revolution and Civil War, 1917—1921
- The Russian Revolution: A New History
- Status of Eastern Carelia, 1923
