= Sword Scabbard Declaration =

Declarations issued by Finnish statesman C.G.E. Mannerheim

The Order of the Day of the Sword Scabbard, or the Sword Scabbard Declaration, actually refers to two related declarations by the Finnish Commander-in-Chief Carl Gustaf Emil Mannerheim during World War I and World War II against Soviet control of East Karelia.

== Background ==
=== World War I ===
During the Civil War in Finland, in February 1918, General Mannerheim, the commander of the anti-communist White Guards, wrote his famous Order of the Day, in which he declared that he would not set his sword to the scabbard "until Lenin's last soldier and hooligan is deported from Finland and White Karelia" ("... ennen kuin viimeinen Leninin soturi ja huligaani on karkoitettu niin hyvin Suomesta kuin Vienan Karjalastakin.").

The events at the end of World War I made this goal hard to accomplish, but nevertheless, two attempts were made to this end: the Viena expedition in 1918 and the Aunus expedition in 1919, during the Russian Civil War, had allowed Finland to occupy and annex two regions of East Karelia - Repola and Porajärvi respectively.

=== Between the wars ===
Hostilities between Finland and Soviet Russia came to an end with the signing of the Treaty of Tartu in 1920. In accordance with the treaty, Soviet Russia ceded Petsamo to Finland and guaranteed special freedoms to the Karelian SSR. In return, Finland had to give up the two previously annexed Karelian counties. This was seen by many Finns as a very bad deal. The peace treaty thus got a nickname, "a Shame Peace" (Häpeärauha in Finnish).

=== World War II ===
Following the Finnish invasion of the Soviet Union on 25 June 1941, Finland was again at war with its eastern neighbour. On 10 July 1941, Mannerheim referred to his 1918 declaration in his "Order of the Day" speech to his troops: "... [I]n 1918 during the War of Liberation I stated to the Finnish and Viena Karelians, that I would not set my sword to the scabbard before Finland and East Karelia would be free." (Finnish: Vapaussodassa vuonna 1918 lausuin Suomen ja Vienan karjalaisille, etten tulisi panemaan miekkaani tuppeen ennen kuin Suomi ja Itä-Karjala olisivat vapaat.) This Order of the Day signified the beginning of an offensive, which would result in a three-year-long occupation of Eastern Karelia.

== Diplomatic consequences ==
Immediately after the Axis invasion, Finland officially declared itself neutral in relation to the conflict. However, German minelayers, which had been hiding in the Finnish archipelago, laid two large minefields across the Gulf of Finland. Later the same night, German bombers flew along the Gulf of Finland to Leningrad and mined its harbor and the river Neva. On the return trip, these bombers landed on the Utti airfield for refueling. After three days, early on the morning of 25 June, preemptive Soviet air raids were launched on Finnish towns, airfields and industrial centers. The country was at war with its larger neighbor once again. This Continuation War was initially defensive for Finland, but with his nearly immediate restatement of his Sword Scabbard Declaration, Mannerheim lost the possibility to brand it a defensive war, or even as a war of revanchism to regain the territory lost in the Winter War, where one-eighth of the Finnish populace lived. Gradually, the Continuation War became, in the eyes of some, a war of conquest, to capture land that had not historically belonged to Finland.

For large segments of the public, both in Finland and in other democratic countries, there was a huge difference between a defensive war and a war of aggression. In the Winter War Finland had the sympathy of virtually the whole world (with the exception of Nazi Germany and the aggressor, the Soviet Union). The chief reason was that Finland, in international opinion, was unjustly attacked by a much larger power. In the Continuation War, on the other hand, Finland was partly an aggressor in the eyes of some, attacking the Soviet Union alongside the Axis invasion. This badly damaged Finland's image in the eyes of the Churchill government and eventually caused the formerly sympathetic Britain to declare war on Finland in December 1941.

== See also ==
- History of Finland
- Heimosodat
- Karelian question in Finnish politics
