= Greater Finland =

Irredentist and nationalist idea that emphasized territorial expansion of Finland

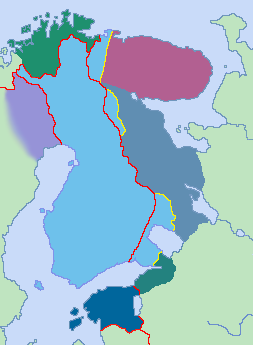
Regions associated with Greater Finland superimposed on modern borders; yellow is the border according to the 1920 Treaty of Tartu and red is the current border according to the 1947 Paris Peace Treaties. East Karelia Estonia Ingria Finland Kola Torne Valley Ruija

Greater Finland (Finnish: Suur-Suomi; Estonian: Suur-Soome; Swedish: Storfinland) is an irredentist and nationalist idea which aims for the territorial expansion of Finland. It is associated with Pan-Finnicism. The most common concept saw the country as defined by natural borders encompassing the territories inhabited by Finns and Karelians, ranging from the White Sea to Lake Onega and along the Svir River and Neva River—or, more modestly, the Sestra River—to the Gulf of Finland. Some extremist proponents also included the Kola Peninsula, Finnmark, Swedish Torne Valley, Ingria, and Estonia.

The idea of a Greater Finland rapidly gained popularity after Finland became independent in December 1917, but has lost support since the end of World War II (1939–1945).

== Definitions ==
The concept of Greater Finland was commonly defined by what was seen as natural borders, which included the areas inhabited by Finns and Karelians. This ranged from the White Sea to Lake Onega and along the Svir River and Neva River. Alternatively, it ranged from the Sestra River to the Gulf of Finland. Some extremists also included the Kola Peninsula and Ingria in Russia, Finnmark in Norway, the Torne Valley in Sweden, and Estonia.

== History ==
=== Natural borders ===
The idea of the so-called three-isthmus border—defined by the White Isthmus (between the White Sea and Lake Onega), the Olonets Isthmus (between Lake Onega and Lake Ladoga), and the Karelian Isthmus (between Lake Ladoga and the Gulf of Finland)—is hundreds of years old, dating back to the period when Finland was part of Sweden. There was a disagreement between Sweden and Russia as to where the border between the two countries should be. The Swedish government considered a three-isthmus border to be the easiest to defend.

Although the term "Greater Finland" was not used in the early 19th century, several ideas of Finland's natural geographical boundaries date back to that time period. In 1837, the botanist Johan Ernst Adhemar Wirzén defined Finland's wild plant distribution area as the eastern border lines of the White Sea, Lake Onega, and the River Svir. In 1855, Zacharias Topelius, the professor of the Imperial Alexander University (now known as the University of Helsinki) stated that the Finnish eastern natural border ran from the Gulf of Finland through the Ladoga and Onega lakes all the way to the Arctic Ocean. The geologist Wilhelm Ramsay defined the bedrock concept of Fennoscandia in 1898.

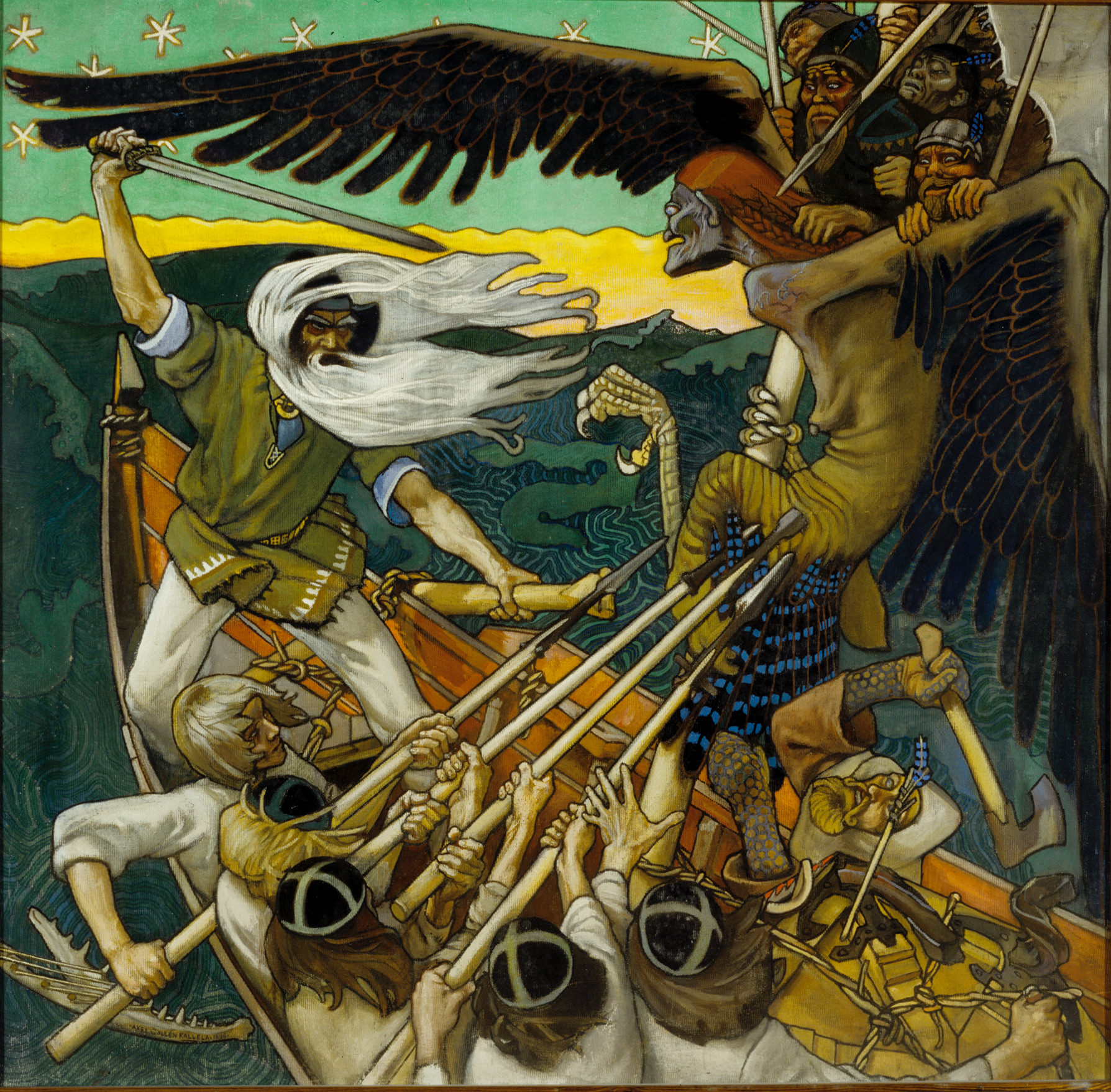
An example of Karelianism: The Defense of the Sampo, 1896, by Akseli Gallen-Kallela.

=== Karelianism ===
Karelianism was a national romantic hobby for artists, writers, and composers in which Karelian and Karelian-Finnish culture was used as a source of inspiration. Karelianism was most popular in the 1890s. For example, the author Ilmari Kianto, known as the "White friend", wrote about his travels to White Karelia in the 1918 book Finland at Its Largest: For the Liberation of White Karelia.

=== Other Nordic countries ===
The Kvens, a minority in Northern Norway, helped Finnish settlements spread, especially in the 1860s. The Academic Karelia Society and the Finnish Heritage Association worked actively with the Kvens from 1927 to 1934, and the Finnish media spread pan-Fennicist propaganda through various channels. Activity slowed down from 1931 to 1934.

In the early days of its independence, Finland wanted Finnish-speaking areas in Norrbotten, Sweden, to join Finland. This was a reaction to the effort by Finland's own Åland to join Sweden. The Finnish government set up a committee to expand Finnish national movements. Sweden, for its part, pushed for instruction in the Swedish language in its northern Finnish regions. Until the 1950s, many schoolchildren in Norrbotten were banned from using the Finnish language during breaks at school.

=== Heimosodat ===
The Greater Finland ideology gained strength from 1918 to 1920, during the Heimosodat, with the goal of combining all Finnic peoples into a single state. Similar ideas also spread in western East Karelia. Two Russian municipalities, Repola and Porajärvi, wanted to become part of Finland but could not under the strict conditions of the Treaty of Tartu. They declared themselves independent in 1919, but the border change was never officially confirmed, mainly because of the treaty, which was negotiated the following year. In the Treaty of Tartu negotiations in 1920, Finland demanded more of Eastern Karelia. Russia agreed to this but kept Repola and Porajärvi for itself, offering Finland Petsamo instead. President Kaarlo Juho Ståhlberg of Finland agreed to the exchange.

Karelians in Uhtua (now Kalevala, Russia) wanted their own state, so they created the Republic of Uhtua. Ingrian Finns also created their own state, North Ingria, but with the intention of being incorporated into Finland. Both states ceased to exist in 1920.

The Greater Finland ideology inspired the Academic Karelia Society, the Lapua movement, and that movement's successor, the Patriotic People's Movement. The Mannerheim Sword Scabbard Declarations in 1918 and 1941 increased enthusiasm for the idea.

=== 1920s and 1930s ===
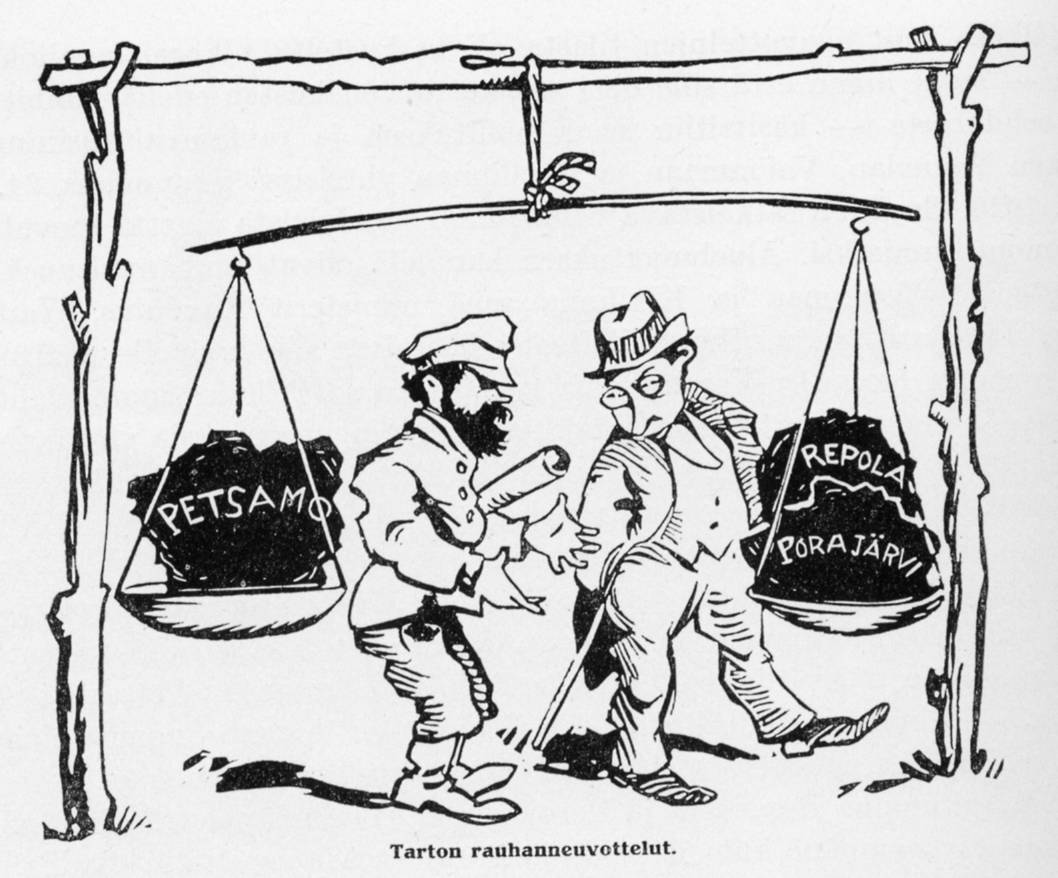
A caricature about the Soviet-Finnish negotiations on the Treaty of Tartu shows the "price" (parts of Karelia) Finland was to pay to gain a corridor to the Arctic Ocean (Kurikka magazine, 30 September 1920).

Under the Treaty of Tartu, Soviet Russia agreed to give Eastern Karelia (known simply as Karelia in the later Soviet Union) political autonomy as a concession to Finnish sentiment. This was in line with the Bolshevik leadership's policy at the time of offering political autonomy to each of the national minorities within the new Soviet state. At the same time, the League of Nations solved the Åland crisis in Finland's favor.

After the Finnish Civil War in 1918, the Red Guards fled to Russia and rose to a leading position in Eastern Karelia. Led by Edvard Gylling, they helped establish the Karelian Workers' Commune. The Reds were also assigned to act as a bridgehead in the Finnish revolution. Finnish politicians in Karelia strengthened their base in 1923 with the establishment of the Karelian ASSR. Finnish nationalists helped some Karelians who were unhappy with the failure of the Karelian independence movement to organize an uprising, but it was unsuccessful, and a small number of Karelians fled to Finland.

After the civil war, a large number of left-wing Finnish refugees fled for the Karelian ASSR. These Finns—an urbanized, educated, and Bolshevik elite—tended to monopolize leadership positions within the new republic. The "Finnishness" of the area was enhanced by some migration of Ingrian Finns, and by the Great Depression. Gylling encouraged Finns in North America to flee to the Karelian ASSR, which was held up as a beacon of enlightened Soviet national policy and economic development.

Even by 1926, 96.6% of the population of the Karelian ASSR spoke Karelian as their mother tongue. No unified Karelian literary language existed, and the prospect of creating one was considered problematic because of the language's many dialects. The local Finnish leadership had a dim view of the potential of Karelian as a literary language and did not try to develop it. Gylling and the Red Finns may have considered Karelian to be a mere dialect of Finnish. They may also have hoped that, through the adoption of Finnish, they could unify Karelians and Finns into one Finnic people. All education of Karelians was conducted in Finnish, and all publications became Finnish (with the exception of some in Russian).

By contrast, the Karelians of Tver Oblast, who had gained a measure of political autonomy independent of Finnish influence, were able by 1931 to develop a literary Karelian based on the Latin alphabet. These Tver Karelians became hostile to what they saw as Finnish dominance of Karelia, as did some of the small, local Karelian intelligentsia. Reactions to the use of Finnish among the Karelians themselves were diverse. Some had difficulty understanding written Finnish. There was outright resistance to the language from residents of Olonets Karelia, while White Karelians had a more positive attitude toward it.

In the summer of 1930, "Finnification politics" became politically sensitive. The Leningrad party apparatus (the powerful southern neighbor of the Karelian Red Finns) began to protest Finnish chauvinism toward the Karelians in concert with the Tver Karelians. This coincided with increasing centralization under Joseph Stalin and the concurrent decline in power of many local minority elites. Gylling and Kustaa Rovio tried to expand the usage of Karelian in certain spheres, but this process was hardly begun before they were deposed. The academic Dmitri Bubrikh then developed a literary Karelian based on the Cyrillic alphabet, borrowing heavily from Russian.

The Central Committee of the Council of Nationalities and the Soviet Academy of Sciences protested the forced Finnification of Soviet Karelia. Bubrikh's Karelian language was adopted from 1937 to 1939, and Finnish was repressed. But the new language, based on an unfamiliar alphabet and with extensive usage of Russian vocabulary and grammar, was difficult for many Karelians to comprehend. By 1939, Bubrikh himself had been repressed, and all forms of Karelian were dropped in both the Karelian ASSR and Tver Oblast (where the Karelian National District was dissolved entirely).

=== The Great Purge ===
In Stalin's Great Purge in 1937, the remaining Red Finns in Soviet Karelia were accused of Trotskyist-bourgeois nationalism and purged entirely from the leadership of the Karelian ASSR. Most Finns in the area were executed or forcefully transferred to other parts of the Soviet Union. During this period, no official usage of Karelian was pursued, and the use of the Finnish language was repressed, relegating it to an extremely marginal role, making Russian the de facto official language of the republic. By this time, the economic development of the area had also attracted a growing number of internal migrants from other areas of the Soviet Union, who steadily diluted the "national" character of the Karelian ASSR.

The Karelo-Finnish Soviet Socialist Republic (KFSSR) was founded by the Soviet Union at the beginning of the Winter War, and was led by the Terijoki government and Otto Wille Kuusinen. This new entity was created with an eye to absorbing a defeated Finland into one greater Finnic (and Soviet) state, and so the official language returned to Finnish. However, the Soviet military was unable to completely defeat Finland, and this idea came to nothing. Despite this, the KFSSR was maintained as a full Union Republic (on a par with Ukraine or Kazakhstan, for example) until the end of the Stalinist period, and Finnish was at least nominally an official language until 1956. The territory Finland was forced to cede under the Moscow Peace Treaty was incorporated partly into the KFSSR, but also into Leningrad Oblast to the south and Murmansk Oblast to the north.

During the Continuation War from 1941 to 1944, about 62,000 Ingrian Finns escaped to Finland from German-occupied areas, of whom 55,000 were returned to the Soviet Union and expelled to Siberia. Starting in the 1950s and 1960s, they were permitted to settle within the KFSSR, although not in Ingria itself.

=== Continuation War ===
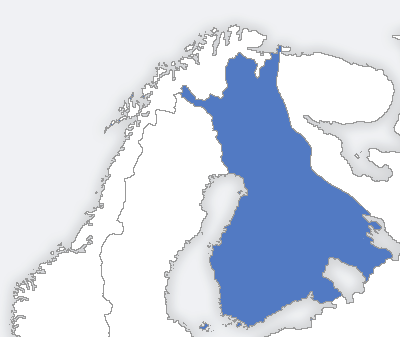
The furthest advance of Finnish units in the Continuation War.

During the civil war in 1918, when the military leader Carl Gustaf Emil Mannerheim was in Antrea, he issued one of his famous Sword Scabbard Declarations, in which he said that he would not "sheath my sword before law and order reigns in the land, before all fortresses are in our hands, before the last soldier of Lenin is driven not only away from Finland, but from White Karelia as well". During the Continuation War, Mannerheim gave the second Sword Scabbard Declaration. In it, he mentioned "the Great Finland", which brought negative attention in political circles.

During the Continuation War, Finland occupied the most comprehensive area in its history. Many people elsewhere, as well as Finland's right-wing politicians, wanted to annex East Karelia to Finland. The grounds were not only ideological and political but also military, as the so-called three-isthmus line were considered easier to defend. On 20 July 1941, a celebration was held in Vuokkiniemi, where White and Olonets Karelia were declared to have joined Finland.

Russians and Karelians were treated differently in Finland, and the ethnic background of the country's Russian-speaking minority was studied to determine which of them were Karelian (i.e., "the national minority") and which were mostly Russian (i.e., "the un-national minority"). The Russian minority were taken to concentration camps so that they would be easier to move away.

In 1941, the government published a German edition of Finnlands Lebensraum, a book supporting the idea of Greater Finland, with the intention of annexing Eastern Karelia and Ingria.

=== Finland's eastern question ===
During the Continuation War's attack phase in 1941, when the Finns hoped for a German victory over the Soviet Union, Finland began to consider what areas it could get in a possible peace treaty with the Soviets. The German objective was to take over the Arkhangelsk-Astrakhan line, which would have allowed Finland to expand to the east. A 1941 book by professor Jalmari Jaakkola, titled Die Ostfrage Finnlands („The Eastern Question of Finland“), sought to justify the occupation of East Karelia. The book was translated into English, Finnish, and French, and received criticism from Sweden and the United States.

The Finnish Ministry of Education established the Scientific Committee of East Karelia on 11 December 1941 to guide research in East Karelia. The first chairman of the commission was the rector of the University of Helsinki, Kaarlo Linkola, and the second chairman was Väinö Auer. Jurists worked to prepare international legal arguments for why Finland should get East Karelia.

== Motivations ==
The rationales of the Greater Finland idea are a subject of disagreement. Some supported the idea out of a desire for wider cultural cooperation. Later, however, the ideology gained clearer imperialist characteristics. The main supporter of the idea, the Academic Karelia Society, was born as a cultural organization, but in its second year, it released a program that dealt with broader strategic, geographical, historical, and political arguments for Greater Finland.

== Modern era ==
The Greater Finland idea is unpopular today among government party members (such as the former Finns Party Youth) and the civilian population alike. Instead, public opinion leans directed toward the re-annexation of Finnish Karelia.

== See also ==
- Finnic countries
- Scandinavism
- Pan-nationalism
- Irredentism

== Sources ==
- Hjelm, Titus; Maude, George (15 August 2021). Historical Dictionary of Finland. Rowman & Littlefield. pp. 130–131. ISBN 978-1-5381-1154-3.
- Manninen, Ohto (1980). Suur-Suomen ääriviivat: Kysymys tulevaisuudesta ja turvallisuudesta Suomen Saksan-politiikassa 1941 [Outlines of Greater Finland: The question of the future and security in Finland's German policy in 1941] (in Finnish). Helsinki: Kirjayhtymä. ISBN 951-26-1735-8.
- Nygård, Toivo (1978). Suur-Suomi vai lähiheimolaisten auttaminen: Aatteellinen heimotyö itsenäisessä Suomessa [Greater Finland or helping neighboring tribes: Ideological tribal work in independent Finland] (in Finnish). Helsinki: Otava. ISBN 951-1-04963-1.
- Tarkka, Jukka (1987). Ei Stalin eikä Hitler - Suomen turvallisuuspolitiikka toisen maailmansodan aikana [Neither Stalin nor Hitler - Finland's security policy during the Second World War] (in Finnish). Helsinki: Otava. ISBN 951-1-09751-2.
- Seppälä, Helge (1989). Suomi miehittäjänä 1941-1944 [Finland as occupier 1941-1944] (in Finnish). Helsinki: SN-kirjat. ISBN 951-615-709-2.
- Morozov, K.A. (1975). Karjala Toisen Maailmansodan aikana 1941-1945 [Karelia during the Second World War 1941-1945] (in Finnish). Petrozavodsk.
- Jaakkola, Jalmari (1942). Die Ostfrage Finnlands (in German). WSOY.
- Näre, Sari; Kirves, Jenni (2014). Luvattu maa: Suur-Suomen unelma ja unohdus [Promised land: Greater Finland's dream and oblivion] (in Finnish). Helsinki: Johnny Kniga. ISBN 978-951-0-40295-5.
- Trifonova, Anastassija. Suur-Suomen aate ja Itä-Karjala [The idea of Greater Finland and Eastern Karelia] (PDF) (in Finnish). University of Tartu, Department of Baltic Finnic Languages. Archived from the original (PDF) on 2016-03-04.
- Solomeštš, Ilja. "Ulkoinen uhka keskustan ja periferian suhteissa: Karjalan kysymys pohjoismaisessa vertailussa 1860–1940" [External threat in center-periphery relations: The question of Karelia in a Nordic comparison 1860–1940]. Carelia (in Finnish). No. 10–1998. pp. 117–119. Archived from the original on 2006-10-11.
- Ryymin, Teemu (1998). Finske nasjonalisters og norske myndigheters kvenpolitikk i mellomkrigstiden [Finnish nationalists' and Norwegian authorities' women's policy in the interwar period.] (in Norwegian). University of Bergen. Web version
- Olsson, Claes. Suur-Suomen muisto [The memory of Greater Finland] (in Finnish). Archived from the original on 2001-03-06.
- Sundqvist, Janne (26 May 2014). Suur-Suomi olisi onnistunut vain natsi-Saksan avulla [Greater Finland would have succeeded only with the help of Nazi Germany] (in Finnish).. Yle uutiset 26.5.2014.
