= Finnish invasion of East Karelia =

Finnish invasion of East Karelia may refer to:

- Two operations during the Heimosodat ("Irredentist Wars") following World War I:
  - Viena expedition (1918)
  - Aunus expedition (1919)
- Finnish invasion of East Karelia (1941) during World War II
