= Paavo Pajula =

Finnish lawyer and diplomat

Paavo Päiviö Pajula (13 September 1878 Lohtaja – 23 April 1961 Helsinki) was a Finnish lawyer and diplomat. He served as an Envoy in Copenhagen and received the Honorary Doctor of Law from the University of Helsinki in 1955.

Pajula's parents were Pastor Lauri Vihtori Pajula (former Widbom) and Fanny Johanna Maria Haake. He graduated from Helsinki Finnish School in 1896 and graduated from the University of Helsinki as a Bachelor of Science and Master in Philosophy in 1900.

Pajula passed a law degree in 1905, graduated as a Licentiate of both law degrees in 1905 and received the title of Master in Law in 1907.

Pajula served as Mayor of Sortavala in 1907–1917. He has been employed by the Ministry for Foreign Affairs since 1919 and served as Envoy in Copenhagen from 1939 to 1945. Pajula received the Honorary Doctor of Law degree in 1955. He also participated in the Tribal War's Aunus expedition in 1919 and served as a member of the Aunus Interim Administration.

Pajula was married since 1909 with Aleksandra Naemi Nathalia Berg.
