= Forest Guerrillas =

East Karelian resistance movement

- Metsäsissit (Finnish); Meččypartizuanat (Karelian)
- War flag of East Karelia, used by the Forest Guerrillas.
- Active: 1920–1922
- Disbanded: February 1922
- Allegiance: Karelian United Government
- Type: Paramilitary
- Size: 3,000+
- Engagements: East Karelian uprising

Commanders
- Notable commanders: Ossippa Borissainen; Ukki Väinämöinen; Paavo Talvela; Jalmari Takkinen

Insignia
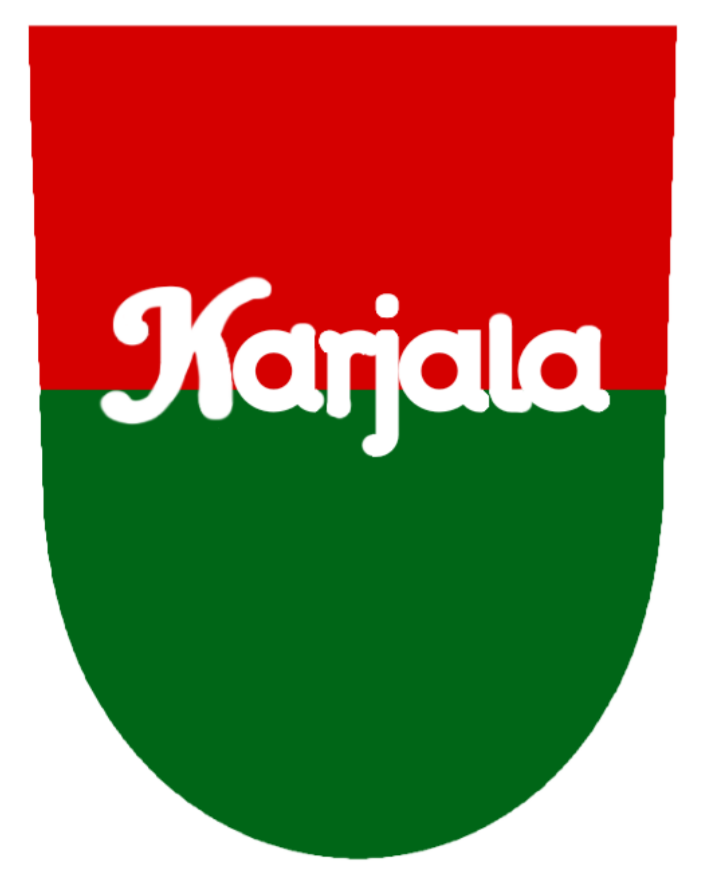
- Identification symbol

Forest Guerrillas (Finnish: Metsäsissit, Karelian: Meččypartizuanat) were an East Karelian resistance movement that was created officially on 14 October 1921. There were around 3,000 Forest Guerrillas in total during the East Karelian Uprising as a Karelian and Finnish resistance movement against Bolshevik Russia, aiming for an East Karelian state with independence from Russia, and in some occasions unification or cooperation with Finland. Most of the soldiers of the Forest Guerrillas were from White Karelia, Repola & Porajärvi and Olonets Karelia. The heraldry of the East Karelian Forest Guerrillas was created by Akseli Gallen-Kallela.

== Origins ==
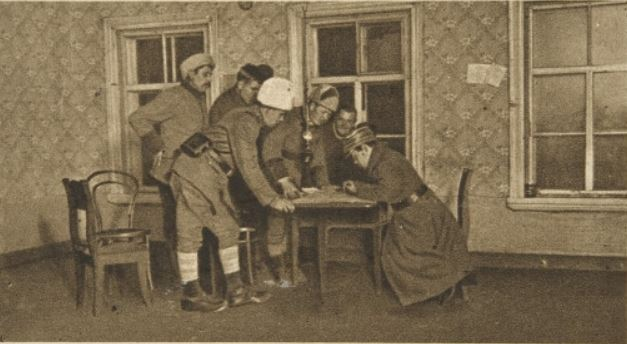
East Karelian Forest Guerrilla headquarters at Kiimasjärvi, with Jalmari Takkinen (Ilmarinen) on the right side.

Near the end of 1921, company-sized militia groups were being formed in East Karelia to fight against the Bolsheviks, due to the official abandonment of Finnish support for the cause of Karelian Independence following the signing of the Tartu Peace Treaty between the Finns and Russians. These militias would be united into the East Karelian Forest Guerrilla Regiment on 14 October 1921, following a meeting between around 200 representatives from all around Karelia at Koivuniemi. The Forest Guerrilla Regiment was sized around 3,000 men strong. In that very meeting held, Ukki Väinämöinen was chosen as the spiritual leader of the Forest Guerrillas, as he was a major proponent and a key figure in Karelian Nationalism, with Ossippa Borissainen also serving a commanding role in the East Karelian Forest Guerrilla Regiment, with Jalmari Takkinen (nom de guerre: Ilmarinen) being chosen as the commander-in-chief of the Forest Guerrillas.

== Structure ==
The political body of the Forest Guerrillas was the Karelian United Government. The body dealing with foreign affairs of East Karelia, mainly asking for help and aid from the Western powers, such as Finland, the United States, Estonia and Poland, was called the Foreign Commission of Karelia. The Forest Guerrillas were divided into three separate units, which were respectively called: the East Karelian Forest Guerrilla Regiment, the Viena Regiment and the Repola Battalion.

== Forest Guerrillas at war ==
=== Advances & victories ===
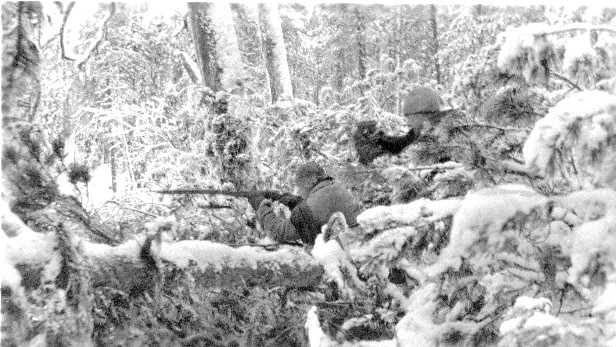
Forest Guerrillas and Finns at Tsolmo, going towards Kiimasjärvi.

On 11 December 1921, the Repola Battalion launched an offensive attack, capturing Repola and forcing the Bolshevik Russians to retreat. With the Forest Guerrillas following closely in pursuit, capturing Lentiera on 15 December 1921, and the pursuit continued until Lupasalmi, where the Bolsheviks were encircled and beaten with significant losses. The pursuit tactics which the Forest Guerrillas were using were efficient, until they were forced to battle the Bolsheviks at Klyyssinvaara and Kuutamalahti, until a tough battle on Christmas night when Porajärvi was captured for the East Karelians.

The Forest Guerrillas had captured around 60,000 square kilometers from the Bolshevik Russians at their highest extent, and there was lots of public support behind them, as Karelian nationalism and Pan-Finnicism were increasingly popular in the rural areas of Karelia.

The Red Army had begun a counter-offensive against the Forest Guerrillas on 5 November, beginning an attack towards the village of Uskela. The Forest Guerrillas had set up defensive positions upon hearing the news and opened fire over the Red Army group traveling over the frozen lake at Uskela. The Forest Guerrillas had defeated the Bolsheviks in their first major encounter.

=== Forest Guerrilla retreat & dissolution ===
On 22 January 1922, the Bolsheviks had begun an all-out counter-offensive against the Forest Guerrillas, moving towards Kokkosalmi. The ensuing battle between the Forest Guerrillas and Bolsheviks was fierce, with both sides taking major casualties. The Forest Guerrillas only had around 800 men at their disposal to defend the village, and they had been blockaded by the Bolsheviks. The Karelian Forest Guerrillas retreated towards Sohjana through a minor gap in the enemy blockade.

The Viena Regiment reorganized with help from the Oulanga Company at Sohjananvirta, and on 26 January they came into contact with the Bolsheviks, and a battle across a frozen river ensued with the Forest Guerrillas holding off the Bolshevik forces until the next day, when they once again retreated, this time retreating to Pistojärvi. On 5 February 1922, they were forced into a defensive battle with the Bolsheviks, where they ultimately retreated across the Finnish-Russian Border into Kainuu, due to the vast Red Army superiority in manpower and the reason that the Forest Guerrillas were lacking ammunition and food supplies.

== See also ==
- Forest Brothers
- Cursed soldiers
- Heimosodat
