= Myyryläinen =

Surname list

Myyryläinen is a Finnish surname. Notable people with the surname include:

- Frans Myyryläinen (1881–1938), Finnish Red Guard
- Kari Myyryläinen (born 1963), Finnish racing cyclist
