= Väinämöinen (disambiguation) =

Väinämöinen is a demigod, hero and the central character in Finnish folklore and the main character in the national epic Kalevala.

Väinämöinen or Wäinämöinen may also refer to:

- Finnish coastal defence ship Väinämöinen
- Wäinämöinen, a Finnish icebreaker
- Ukki Väinämöinen (1855–1942), Karelian ideological leader
- Väinämöinen, a 1974 album by Jukka Kuoppamäki
