= Paavo Talvela =

Finnish general

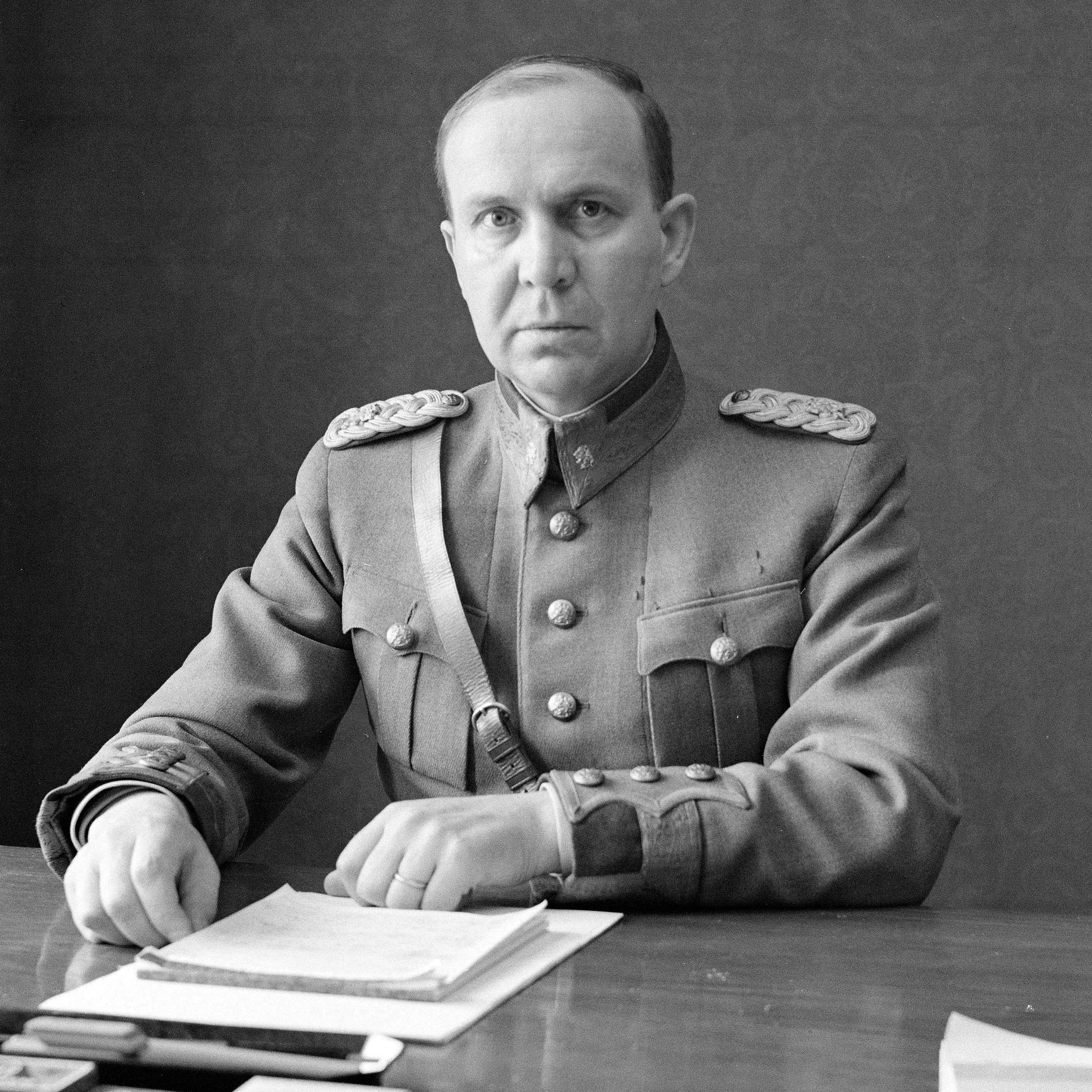
- Born: 19 February 1897; Helsingin maalaiskunta, Grand Duchy of Finland, Russian Empire
- Died: 30 September 1973 (aged 76) Helsinki, Finland
- Buried: Kulosaari Cemetery
- Allegiance: German Empire (1916–1918); Finland (1918–1946)
- Branch: Imperial German Army; Finnish Jäger troops; Finnish Army
- Service years: 1916–1946
- Rank: General of the Infantry (1966)
- Commands: Commander-in-chief, Aunus expedition; Savo Jäger Regiment (1926–1927); Group Talvela (1939–1940); III Corps (1940); II Corps (1941); VI Corps (1941–1942); Aunus Group (1944)
- Conflicts: World War I; Eastern Front; Finnish Civil War; Kinship Wars; Aunus expedition; Viena expedition; World War II; Winter War; Battle of Tolvajärvi; Continuation War; Invasion of Ladoga Karelia; Svir–Petrozavodsk offensive
- Awards: Mannerheim Cross; Order of the Cross of Liberty; Order of the White Rose; Iron Cross; German Cross in Gold; Order of Merit of the German Eagle; Order of the Sword; Order of Vasa; Order of the Crown of Italy; Order of St. Olav

Paavo Juho Talvela (born Paavo Juho Thorén; 19 February 1897 – 30 September 1973) was a Finnish general of the infantry and a member of the Jäger movement. He commanded major formations during the Winter War and the Continuation War, leading Finnish forces to victory at the Battle of Tolvajärvi in December 1939, and was the second person ever to receive the Mannerheim Cross. From 1942 to 1944 he served as the Finnish army's representative at the German high command. Talvela had earlier participated in the Eastern Front of World War I, the Finnish Civil War and the Finnish Kinship Wars.

Outside the army, Talvela was active in radical nationalist politics during the interwar period, being involved in the founding of the Academic Karelia Society and in the Lapua Movement, for which he organized the Peasant March of 1930. He also held senior positions in Finnish business, including as deputy director of the state alcohol monopoly Oy Alkoholiliike Ab and as director of the transport company Pohjolan Liikenne. He resigned from active military service four times during his career — to volunteer in the Kinship Wars or to take civilian positions — and has been described as "Finland's most senior reserve officer".

== Early life and Jäger Movement ==
Paavo Juho Talvela (originally Thorén) was born on 19 February 1897 to farmer parents Johan Fredrik Thorén and Helena Uino in Helsingin maalaiskunta. One of eleven children, Talvela enrolled in secondary education, but became involved in the Jäger Movement, where Finnish volunteers received military training in Germany, leaving for Germany in 1916. While in Germany, the Finnish volunteers formed the 27th Royal Prussian Jäger Battalion, fighting for the Imperial German Army on the Eastern Front of World War I. During this time, Talvela saw combat in battles in the regions of Misa and Gulf of Riga, but was sent to Sweden and Finland for "special tasks" in 1917. He was arrested at the border between Finland and Sweden and detained by Swedish authorities for several months. In late 1917, Talvela was able to enter Finland by traveling to Turku via Åland. In December 1917, Talvela moved from Turku to Vimpeli, where he would act as a military instructor.

== Civil War and Kinship Wars ==
During 1918, Talvela took part in the Finnish Civil War on the side of the Whites under the pseudonym Strömsten. During the war, Talvela was promoted directly from the rank of jäger to lieutenant in the Finnish Army.

Promoted to major after the civil war, Talvela briefly commanded a battalion and a regiment before resigning in 1919 to serve as a regimental commander in the Kinship Wars of the 1920s. He became commander-in-chief of the Aunus expedition and a member of its short-lived provisional government, but rejoined the Finnish Army following the expedition's failure. He continued to view East Karelian integration as crucial for the security and economy of newly-independent Finland, and resigned for a second time in 1921 to command a battalion during the Viena expedition, which also ended in failure. He returned to military service in 1922. He was also involved behind-the-scenes in the founding of the Academic Karelia Society, a student association that was also the first Finnish radical nationalistic movement.

== Interwar period ==
Having returned to service, Talvela graduated from the English Coast Artillery School in 1923 before acting as the chief of coastal artillery in 1925. In 1926, he graduated from the Finnish War College, taking on the duties of commander of the Savo Jäger Regiment in 1926–1927. Following a 1925 promotion to lieutenant colonel, he was promoted a colonel in 1928. In 1930, he acted as the head of the Finnish General HQ's Operations Section, but conflicts with the head of the Finnish General Staff Martti Wallenius led to Talvela's third resignation.

Following his resignation, Talvela became politically active. He was a member of the electoral college for the President of Finland in 1931. He also became active in the radically nationalistic and "fascist-style" Lapua Movement, organizing the Peasant March. The movement was disbanded in the wake of the Mäntsälä Rebellion. Talvela ran for parliament as a member of Kokoomus in 1936 but was not elected. Talvela was also active in various economic affairs, working as the deputy director of Suomi-Filmi from 1929 to 1932 and the Finnish state alcohol monopoly Oy Alkoholiliike Ab from 1932 to 1937, following the end of the Finnish prohibition. From 1937 to 1939, Talvela worked as the deputy director of Suomen selluloosayhdistys, the association of Finnish cellulose producers. Concurrently with these duties, Talvela continued his activities in national defense, working as the chair of the Jäger Union to 1934 and in the governmental Defense Council.

== Winter War ==
In the lead-up to the Winter War, Talvela had been promoted to major general and became a member of the war materiel council. Two days after the Soviet assault on 30 November 1939, he approached commander-in-chief Carl Gustaf Emil Mannerheim requesting a field command, proposing that he be given command of a regiment of the 7th Division, then held in reserve. On 6 December, Mannerheim ordered that the Finnish IV corps would be split into two commands, with one being given to Talvela. Talvela's orders were to halt and throw back the Soviet advance in the area of Tolvajärvi.

The Finnish position in the Tolvajärvi region was in severe danger, and upon arriving in his area of operations Talvela's first task was to halt the retreat of Infantry Regiment 16. The following Battle of Tolvajärvi resulted in a Soviet retreat and the first Finnish victory of the war: The Soviet 139th Rifle Division lost its headquarters and most of its artillery. The 139th Division was replaced with the 75th Division, which was also forced to retreat just a few days later. Following these victories, the area saw only limited action to the end of the war. In February, Talvela was given command of the III Corps on the Karelian Isthmus in the area of Vuoksi and Lake Sukhodolskoye.

== Interim Peace ==
During the Interim Peace, in 1940, Talvela took part in the Finno-German negotiations regarding weapons shipments and the movement of German troops through Finland. He was made the chair of Suomen Aseveljien Liitto, the Union of Finnish Brothers-in-Arms. Talvela was also involved in 1940 talks about establishing a Finnish jaeger battalion within the German Wehrmacht. While these talks didn't lead to results, the Germans recruited some 1400 Finnish volunteers into the Finnish Volunteer Battalion of the Waffen-SS between 1941 and 1943.

== Continuation War ==
At the start of the Continuation War in 1941, Talvela commanded the II Corps, but immediately following the start of the hostilities he was given command of the VI Corps. For Talvela, who was inspired by the kindred peoples ideology, the offensive into East Karelia took on the character of personal revenge, as it took place on the same battlefields where his Aunus and Viena expeditions had failed twenty years earlier. Under his command, the VI Corps participated in the Finnish invasion of Ladoga Karelia. As part of the Army of Karelia, VI Corps surrounded parts of the Soviet 7th Army north of Lake Ladoga. On 3 August 1941, Talvela was granted the Mannerheim Cross, becoming the second recipient after Ruben Lagus; the citation recognized both his personal bravery and his skillful conduct of operations in Ladoga Karelia. The VI Corps reached Svir in September 1941, with the Finnish forces forming a 100 kilometer wide, 20 kilometer deep bridgehead over the river, thus cutting the Murmansk railroad. The Finns' refusal to advance further from Svir caused strain in the Finno-German relations, as German forces were able to reach a point some 80 kilometers to the southwest of the Finnish positions. The Germans had even moved the German 163rd Division to the Svir to help in securing the flanks for the "handshake at the Svir". The issue resolved itself once Soviet counter-attacks pushed the Germans further from the Svir in the south. In January 1942, Talvela was removed from his position as the commander of VI Corps and transferred to Germany, where he was the representative of the Finnish army in the German high command. Although respected by the Germans as Mannerheim's loyal representative, Talvela's background — including his prominent membership of the Freemasons — fitted poorly with National Socialist principles, and his relations with the SS organization and the Finnish SS battalion remained cool.

Talvela was recalled to Finland in February 1944. Having been promoted to lieutenant general in 1942, he was given command of the Aunus Group, which was in charge of the Finnish forces along the Svir. Following a Soviet landing in Tuloksa as part of the Soviet Svir–Petrozavodsk Offensive in 1944, the Finnish IV Corps, part of Talvela's Aunus Group, was in danger of being cut off. When the commander of VI Corps, general Aarne Blick, requested permission to pull back, Talvela refused and ordered the corps to instead conduct a delaying action. Blick ignored the orders, pulling VI Corps back, causing significant strain in the two commanders' personal relations. The animosity resulted in the replacement of Blick on 6 July.

On 16 July 1944, the Aunus Group was disbanded and Talvela was ordered to return to Germany. He would stay in Germany until the Finno-Soviet cease-fire and the breaking of the Finno-German relations, both of which came as a surprise to him. Before leaving Germany, Talvela was approached by Himmler, who requested that Talvela would lead Finnish armed resistance. Talvela indicated that he would be willing to lead a resistance movement, but only under orders from Mannerheim.

== Later life ==
Talvela left the army in September 1944, returning to his job as the director of Pohjolan Liikenne which he had taken during the Interim Peace. As a result of the time he had spent in Germany during the war, he found working in Finland difficult, and lived in Rio de Janeiro selling cellulose between 1946 and 1949. Talvela returned to Finland in 1949, serving as a member of the City Council of Helsinki between 1954 and 1960. In 1958, he was the head consul for Philippines. He continued to be active in various activities related to paper production until his retirement. Talvela received his final promotion to the rank of general of the infantry (Finnish: jalkaväenkenraali) in 1966.

== Personal life ==
Talvela married twice during his life. His first marriage with Martta Sofia Nikoskelainen ran from 1919 to 1922, ending in a divorce. He remarried in 1923 to Karin Johanna Tengman. During his marriages, Talvela had a total of four children, born between 1919 and 1926. He secretly had a fifth child born out of wedlock, Swedish writer Gunilla Boëthius in 1945; this was not discovered until long after his death. Talvela died on 30 September 1973 in Helsinki. He is buried in the Kulosaari Cemetery in Helsinki.

== Awards ==
During his career, Talvela was granted several awards. The most notable of these is the Mannerheim Cross, which Talvela was the second to receive. He also received the Finnish Order of the Cross of Liberty and the Order of the White Rose. He also received the German Iron Cross (both 1st and 2nd class), German Cross in Gold and the Order of Merit of the German Eagle; the Swedish Order of the Sword and Order of Vasa; the Order of the Crown of Italy; and the Norwegian Order of St. Olav.

== Character and legacy ==
Described as having a difficult personality and ambitious as a soldier, Talvela frequently came into conflict with his superiors, colleagues and subordinates. His relationship with Mannerheim, however, was always impeccable. Originally regarded as an Anglophile, he was nevertheless able to work effectively with the Germans despite not subscribing to Nazi ideology. In his later decades, Talvela was known as virtually the only Jäger general to maintain good relations with President Urho Kekkonen, who otherwise generally avoided promoting Jäger officers; it was Kekkonen who in 1966 promoted Talvela to general of the infantry.
