= Pork mutiny =

1922 military incursion by Soviet soldiers into Finnish territory

The Pork Mutiny (Finnish: Läskikapina Swedish: Fläskrevolten) was an incident in Northern Finland in 1922. On February 2, an incursion group consisting of 67 armed officers and enlisted members of Soviet Russia crossed the Finnish-Soviet border near Kuolajärvi and Savukoski. They advanced to a logging yard owned by Kemi Oy. They arrested the heads of the yard and confiscated the cashbox.

One possible explanation for the name of the incident derives from the event where the leader of the incursion, Frans Myyryläinen, better known by his nom de guerre Jahvetti Moilanen, stood on a crate that had formerly contained lard when he delivered his speech called the 'Declaration of Battle of the Red Guerrilla Battalion of the North'. After the speech, 283 workers and members of their families joined the battalion and were armed and given money. The Battalion then made its way back to the border. On its way, it robbed several other logging yards and a border guard unit. On February 7, the battalion, by that time about 240 men, crossed the border back to the Soviet Russia. Information of the incident was received at Rovaniemi only on February 5, and the battalion managed to slip away before members of the White Guard arrived.

== See also ==
- Aunus expedition
- Finnish Civil War
- Heimosodat
