= Status of Eastern Carelia =

1923 advisory opinion of the World Court

Status of Eastern Carelia was an advisory opinion of the Permanent Court of International Justice in 1923. The Council of the League of Nations requested the Court to give its opinion on whether a declaration made by the Russian Soviet Federative Socialist Republic annexed to the Treaty of Dorpat obliged Russia to ensure the autonomy of Eastern Karelia. In the event, the Court declined to give such an opinion as the case related to an actual dispute between the two states Finland and Russia.
