= War Victims of Finland 1914–1922 =

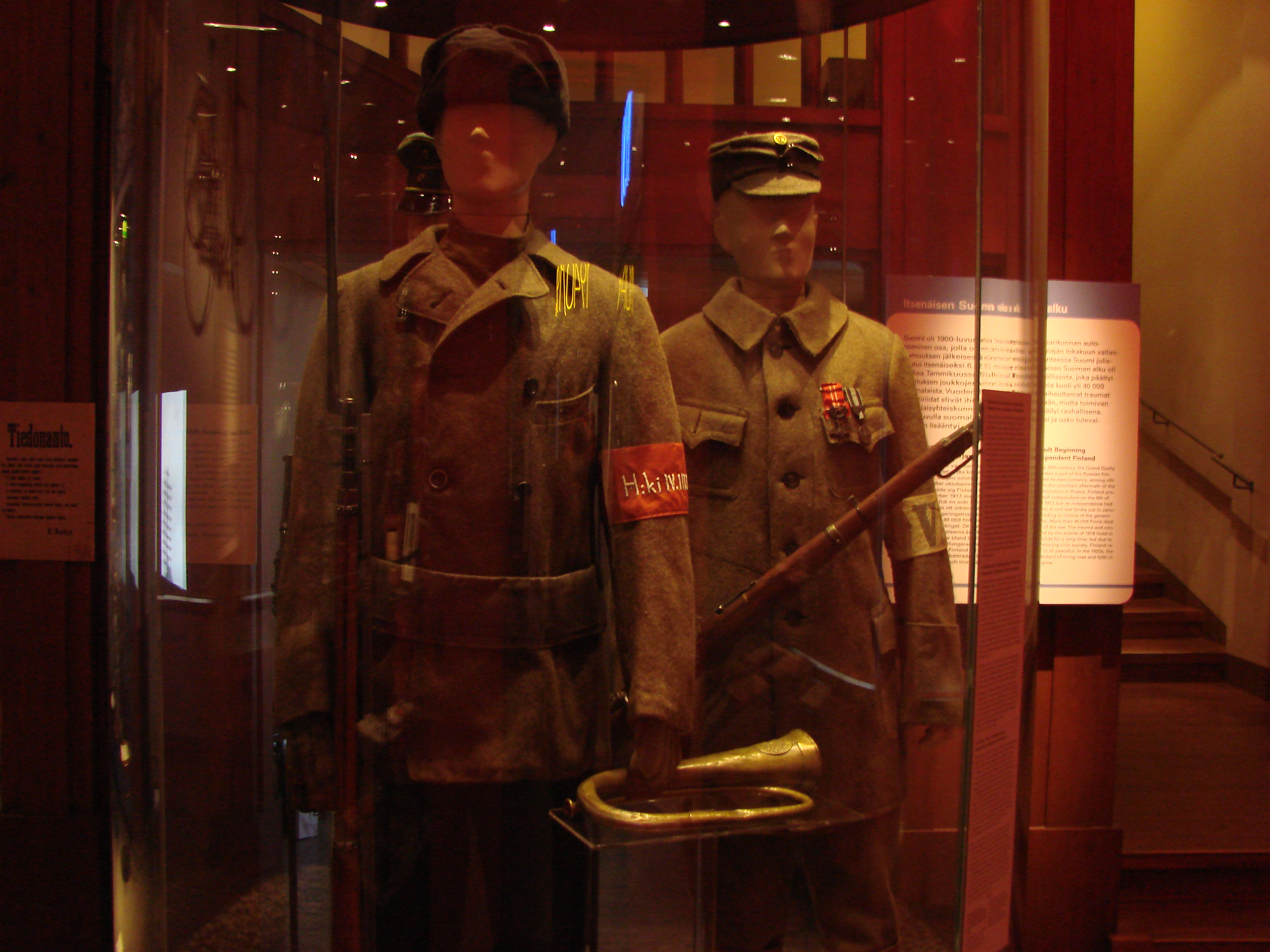
Uniforms worn by soldiers in the Finnish Civil War

War Victims of Finland 1914–1922 (Finnish: Suomen sotasurmat 1914–1922 Swedish: Krigsdöda i Finland 1914–1922) is a database that contains the names and information of more than 35,000 Finnish war dead between 1914 and 1922. The database was opened in 2002 and it is published by the National Archives of Finland.

The registry contains victims of World War I (1914–1918), the Finnish Civil War (1918) and the so-called Kinship Wars (1918–1922). About 97 per cent of the names are casualties of the civil war or its aftermath. Persons in the registry can be searched by surname, first name, date of birth, occupation, place of census registration, place of residence, place of death, and by the cause of death. The research version of the database has more information than the simplified internet version.
