= Kustaa Rovio =

Finnish Communist politician (1887–1938)

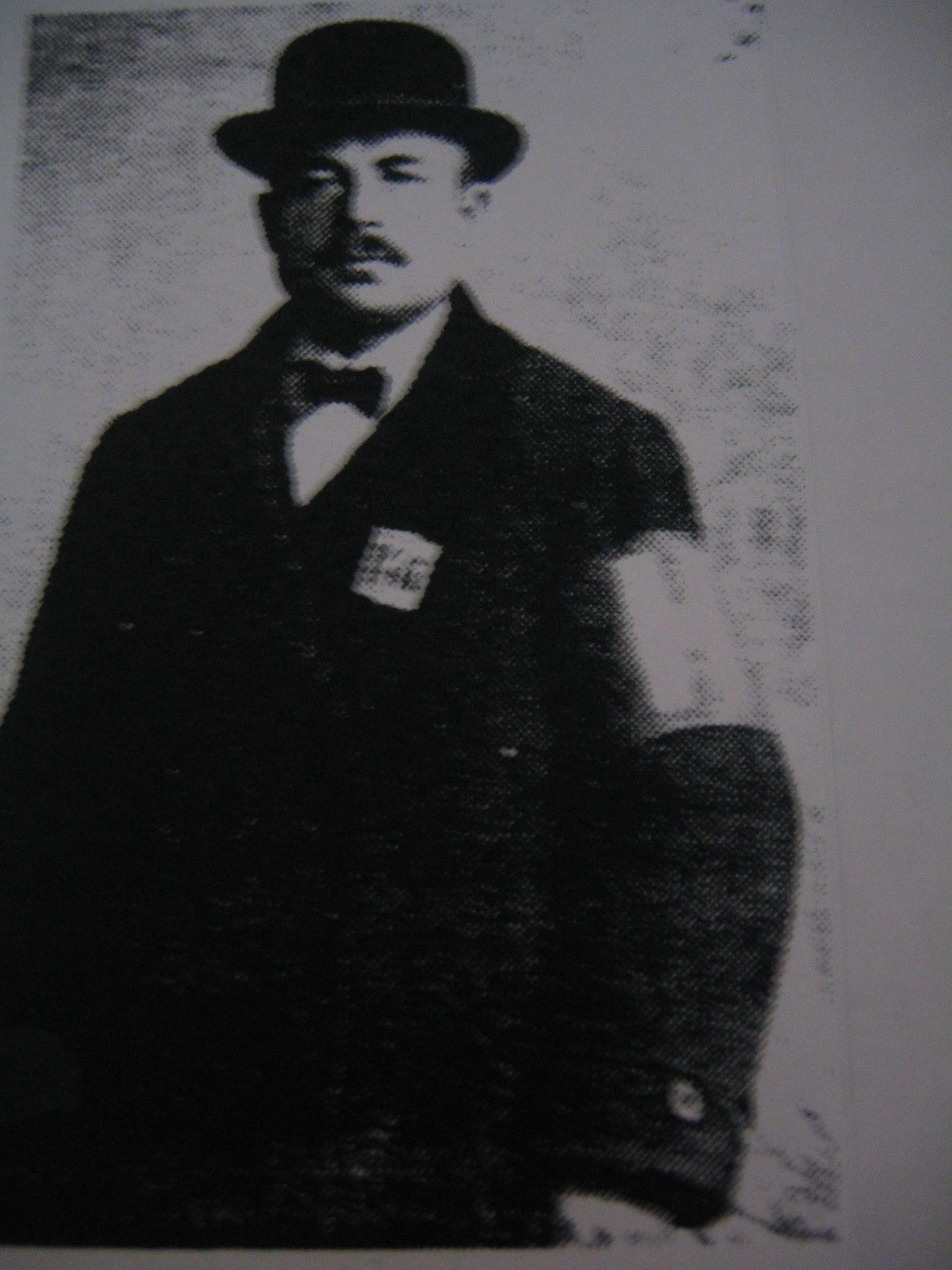
Kustaa Rovio

Kustaa Adolf Simonpoika Rovio (23 January 1887 in Saint Petersburg – 21 April 1938) also known as Gustav Ravelin, was a Finnish Communist politician and was the First Secretary of the Karelian Communist Party. Rovio was executed during the Great Purge. He was also the head of the Helsingfors (Helsinki) Police.

== Biography ==
Kustaa Rovio was born in a Russian-speaking Finnish family from the Petrograd (Saint Petersburg) area. At the age of 12, he began working as a delivery boy in workshops, then as a turner at the Atlas plant, and began attending Marxist circles.

In 1905, he took part in the procession to the Winter Palace. In December 1905, he joined the RSDLP. In 1907, he was arrested and exiled to Vologda, from where he fled. In 1910, he was arrested again and exiled to Tula. He then fled to Finland and became a member of the Social Democratic Party of Finland. From 1913 to 1915, he worked as the Secretary of the Central Committee of the Social Democratic Youth Union of Finland. During the February Revolution, he was nominated to the post of chief of police of Helsingfors (Helsinki).

Rovio sheltered Vladimir Lenin in his apartment at 1 Hakaniemi Square, in the north of Helsingfors from 10 August 1917. Lenin demanded Rovio to procure Russian newspapers every day and arrange the secret delivery of letters back to his party comrades.

After the Finnish Civil War, Rovio fled to Russia and rose to political prominence in Karelia. From 1920 to 1926, he was Commissar of the Petrograd International Military School and Vice-rector of the Leningrad branch of the Communist University of the National Minorities of the West. He also participated in the suppression of the Kronstadt rebellion and the Karelian uprising. From 1929, Rovio was the first secretary of the Karelian communist party for six years and was the chief party figure in Soviet Karelia. He demanded for Finnish to be made the second state language, alongside Russian.

In August 1935, Rovio was removed as party secretary. After losing his positions, he left Karelia and was permitted to live in Moscow. He was arrested in the July 1937 and was accused of being a traitor and an agent of German-Finnish fascism. Rovio's fate remained a mystery until 2002 when documents were released to the Memorial Society from the Archive of the President of the Russian Federation. On April 19, 1938, Rovio's execution by shooting was approved and he was shot at Kommunarka shooting ground on 21 April.
