= Aunus expedition =

Attempt by Finnish volunteers to occupy East Karelia in 1919

- Part of Heimosodat
Date	April 21 – September 18, 1919
Location	Aunus
Result	Bolshevik victory

Belligerents
Finnish volunteers: Olonets Government	Russian SFSR

Commanders and leaders
Colonel Aarne Sihvo; Lieutenant Colonel Ero Gadolin; Major Gunnar von Hertzen; Major Paavo Talvela; Captain Ragnar Nordström	Leon Trotsky

Strength
Finland; 2,500–2,700; Aunus; 1,000	20,000

Casualties and losses
300–400 killed 600–800 wounded	1,000 killed 1,800 wounded

The Aunus expedition (Finnish: Aunuksen retkikunta; Swedish: Aunus-expeditionen) was an attempt by Finnish volunteers to occupy parts of East Karelia in 1919, during the Russian Civil War. Aunus is the Finnish name for Olonets Karelia. This expedition was one of many Finnic "kinship wars" (heimosodat) fought against forces of Soviet Russia after the Russian Revolution of 1917 and during the Russian Civil War.

== Background ==
In February 1918 General Mannerheim, the commander of the anti-communist White Guards, wrote his famous "sword scabbard order of the day," in which he said that he would not put his sword into the scabbard until East Karelia was free of Russian control. After the Finnish Civil War there was much public discussion about joining East Karelia to Finland, although the primarily Finnic Russian East Karelia never was a part of the Swedish Empire or the Grand Duchy of Finland.

Earlier attempts in 1918 to Petsamo and White Karelia (Viena expedition) had failed, partly due to a passive attitude of the Karelians. Later the British occupied White Karelia.

During the summer of 1918, the government of Finland received various appeals from East Karelia for joining the area to Finland. Especially active were the inhabitants of the parish of Repola, which had held a vote to join Finland. The Finnish Army occupied the parish in the fall of 1918. In January 1919 a small expedition of volunteers occupied the parish of Porajärvi, but was quickly repulsed by Bolshevik forces. Porajärvi held a vote on January 7 to also join Finland.

In February 1919 Mannerheim made clear to the Western powers and the White Army that Finland would attack the Bolsheviks in Saint Petersburg if it would receive material and moral support. During the same time the plans for the Aunus expedition were prepared and Jaeger-Major Gunnar von Hertzen was chosen as the commander of the troops. He thought that the expedition would succeed with a thousand Finnish volunteers, but only if the Karelians would join the fighting. Mannerheim approved the plan, but demanded that Britain would also have to approve of it before it could proceed.

On May 15, 1918, as the Olonets Government of Southern Karelia would be founded following Finland's declaration of war on Soviet Russia.

== Expedition ==
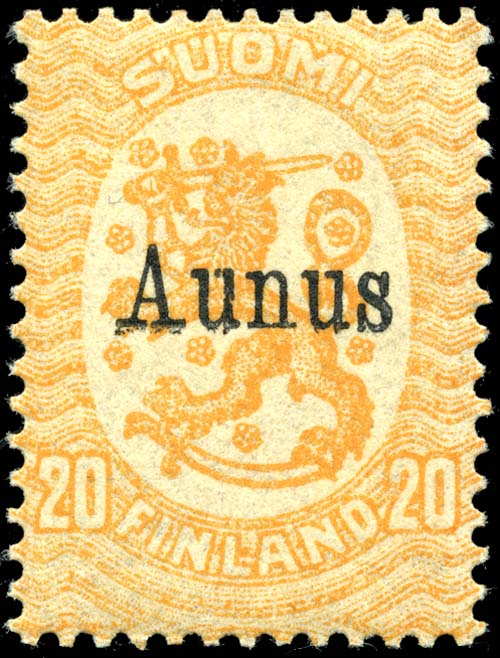
Stamp from 1919

The expedition crossed the border on the night of April 21, 1919. The goals were to capture Lodeynoye Pole, Petrozavodsk and the Murmansk railroad. The troops were divided into three groups and were made up of 1000 volunteers. The southern group advanced to Lodeynoye Pole in just three days, but was pressed back behind River Tuulos by Bolshevik troops. The northern group captured Prääsä. At this time it became obvious that there were not enough troops to complete the goals of the expedition. A new round of recruiting 2000 new volunteers was started and Mannerheim made Aarne Sihvo the new commander of the expedition.

Following the capture of Olonets on April 23, 1919, the Olonets Government of Southern Karelia was renamed to the Provisional Caretaker Government of Olonets.

Major Paavo Talvela's regiment started an attack aimed at Petrozavodsk on June 20, but was beaten by Red Army and Finnish Red Guard forces just outside the town. The British troops that operated along the Murmansk railroad were quite close by, but did not participate.

The Finns had hoped that the Karelian population would have joined the troops as volunteers but only a few did and their morale was never very high.

The initiative now passed to the Bolsheviks. On June 26 over 600 Finns of the Red Officer School in Saint Petersburg made a landing at Vitele across Lake Ladoga behind the Finnish lines. The southern group was forced to retreat to Finland after suffering heavy losses. Talvela's group was also forced to retreat back to Finland.

== Aftermath ==
The only result from the expedition was that the parish of Porajärvi declared on June 6 that it wished to join Finland, as the parish of Repola had already done in 1918. The regular Finnish Army moved in to occupy the parish. In the treaty of Tartu in 1920 Finland and Soviet Union agreed on their common border. Repola and Porajärvi were left on the Soviet side and the Finnish troops had to be withdrawn before February 14, 1921. The young police chief in Repola, Bobi Sivén, shot himself in protest.
