= Frans Myyryläinen =

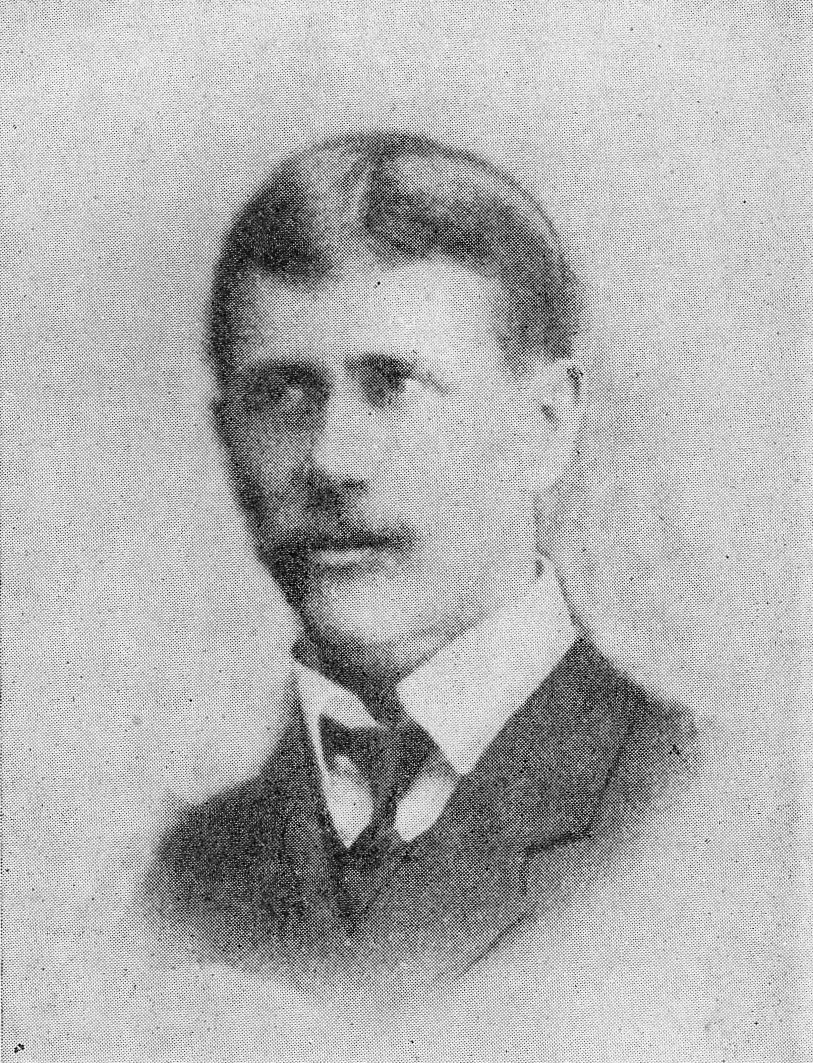
Frans Myyryläinen

Frans Johan ”Janne” Myyryläinen (30 December 1881 —8 May 1938) was a Finnish Red Guard during the Finnish Civil War and journalist who wrote under the pen name Juuso Matero. He was also a Red Guardian in Kainuu and an officer Guardian in Soviet Russia. He is best known under the nom de guerre Jahvetti Moilanen, which he used as leader of the 1922 Pork Mutiny.

== Career ==
Born in Vyborg, Myyryläinen worked as forest guardian and as a shopkeeper in Kainuu and as an inspector in the early 20th century. He became a member in the Kainuu Red Guard. The opposition White Guard declared him to be a dangerous man.

During the civil war in 1918, Myyryläinen was arrested and tried. He escaped and was recaptured. On his way to the Hennala camp in Lahti, Myyryläinen was able to escape a second time, fleeing to the Soviet Union. There, he organized an underground movement in Kainuu.

=== Rebellion ===
Myyryläinen is known as the leader of the pork mutiny in 1922 in Salla and in Savukoski. Using the name Jahvetti Moilanen, he stood on a crate that had formerly contained pork and delivered a speech that called the Declaration of Battle of the Red Guerrilla Battalion of the North. After the speech, some 300 workers joined the battalion and were armed and given money. The Battalion then returned to the border.

On its way, it robbed a group of border guards and other workplaces. On 7 February, the battalion, by that time numbering 240 men, crossed back into the Soviet Union. Information on the incident was received at Rovaniemi too late and the battalion slipped away before the White Guard arrived. In the Soviet Union, Myyryläinen continued as a Red Army teacher in the Russian part of Karelia. Later, he worked as journalist in Petrozavodsk using the name Juuso Matero.

== Personal life ==
Myyryläinen was married twice and had three children by his second marriage.

== Arrest, death and legacy ==
During the Great Purges, Myyryläinen was arrested on 5 May 1938 and was executed three days later, possibly at Petrozavodsk. During the Khrushchev thaw, a military tribune overturned the verdict against Myyryläinen on 21 May 1957. The location of his grave is unknown.
