= Olonets Isthmus =

Istmus in Russia

Coordinates: 61.6°N 33.4°E

Olonets Isthmus is an isthmus between Lake Onega and Lake Ladoga in Russia.
