= Heimosodat =

Interwar anti-Soviet conflicts in territories of Finnic peoples

- Part of the Russian Civil War
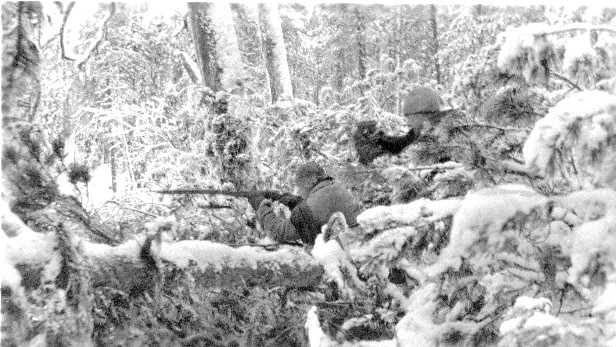
- Finnish and East Karelian soldiers fighting side by side against Russians during the East Karelian uprising
Date	21 March 1918 – 21 March 1922 (4 years)
Location	Estonia; Karelia; Ingria; Petsamo; East Karelia
Result	Treaty of Tartu; Finnish victory in Estonia and annexation of Petsamo; Soviet victory in White Karelia, Aunus, Petrograd, and East Karelia

Belligerents
Finnish White Guard; Estonia; Uhtua; Forest Guerrillas; North Ingria; United Kingdom (Estonian War of Independence)	Russian SFSR; Finnish Red Guards; Commune of Estonia; United Kingdom; (Viena expedition and Petsamo expeditions)

Commanders and leaders
Kurt Martti Wallenius (Estonia) Johan Laidoner (Republic of Uhtua) Ukki Väinämöinen; Georg Elfvengren (executed)	Jukums Vācietis; Leon Trotsky

Strength
Finland: ~10,000	Red Army: 113,000; Red Guard: 1,500

The map shows Finland within the borders of the Grand Duchy. The areas in light red represent the territorial gains hoped for as part of a Greater Finland. A border along the Karelian, Olonets and White Isthumuses (three-isthumus border) would have drastically shortened the length of the border with Russia.

The Finnish term Heimosodat (singular heimosota) (Note: Estonian: hõimusõjad, Swedish: frändefolkskrigen, German: Kriege verwandter Völker) refers to a series of armed conflicts and private military expeditions in 1918–1922 into areas of the former Russian Empire that bordered on Finland and were inhabited in large part by other Finnic peoples.

The term has been translated into English as "Kindred Nations Wars", "Wars for kindred peoples", "Kinfolk wars", or "Kinship Wars," specifically referring to Finnic kinship. Finnish volunteers took part in these conflicts, either to assert Finnish control over areas inhabited by related Finnic peoples, or to help them gain independence from Soviet Russia. Many of the volunteers were inspired by the idea of "Greater Finland". Some of the conflicts were incursions from Finland, and some were local uprisings in which volunteers wanted either to help people fight for independence or to annex areas to Finland. According to Aapo Roselius, about 10,000 volunteers from Finland took part in the armed conflicts mentioned below.

- Viena expedition (1918)
  - Murmansk Legion
- Petsamo expeditions (1918 and 1920)
- Estonian War of Independence (1918–1920)
  - Pohjan Pojat (lit. 'Sons of the North') and 1st Finnish Volunteer Corps (I Suomalainen Vapaajoukko) helped Estonian troops.
- Revolt of the Ingrian Finns (1918–1920)
- Aunus expedition (1919)
- Advance on Petrograd (1919)
- East Karelian Uprising (1921–1922)

The phenomenon is closely linked to nationalism and irredentism, as Finland had just formally gained its national independence in 1917, and a part of the population felt that they had obligations to help other Finnic peoples to attain the same. Estonia, the closest and numerically largest "kindred nation", had gained its independence at the same time, but had fewer resources, fewer institutions ready to support its attained position, and more Bolshevik Russian troops within its borders. Other Finnic peoples were at a less organized level of cultural, economic and political capability. The Finnish Civil War had awakened strong nationalistic feelings in Finnish citizens and other Finnic peoples, and they sought tangible ways to put these feelings into action. For the two next decades, Finns participated at a relatively high rate in nationalistic activities (e.g. Karelianism and Finnicization of the country and its institutions). This development was related to the trauma and divisiveness of the Finnish Civil War. Many White sympathizers in the Civil War became radically nationalistic as a result of the war. The strenuous five-year period of World War II — which also mostly unified the nation — reduced this enthusiasm.

== Glossary ==
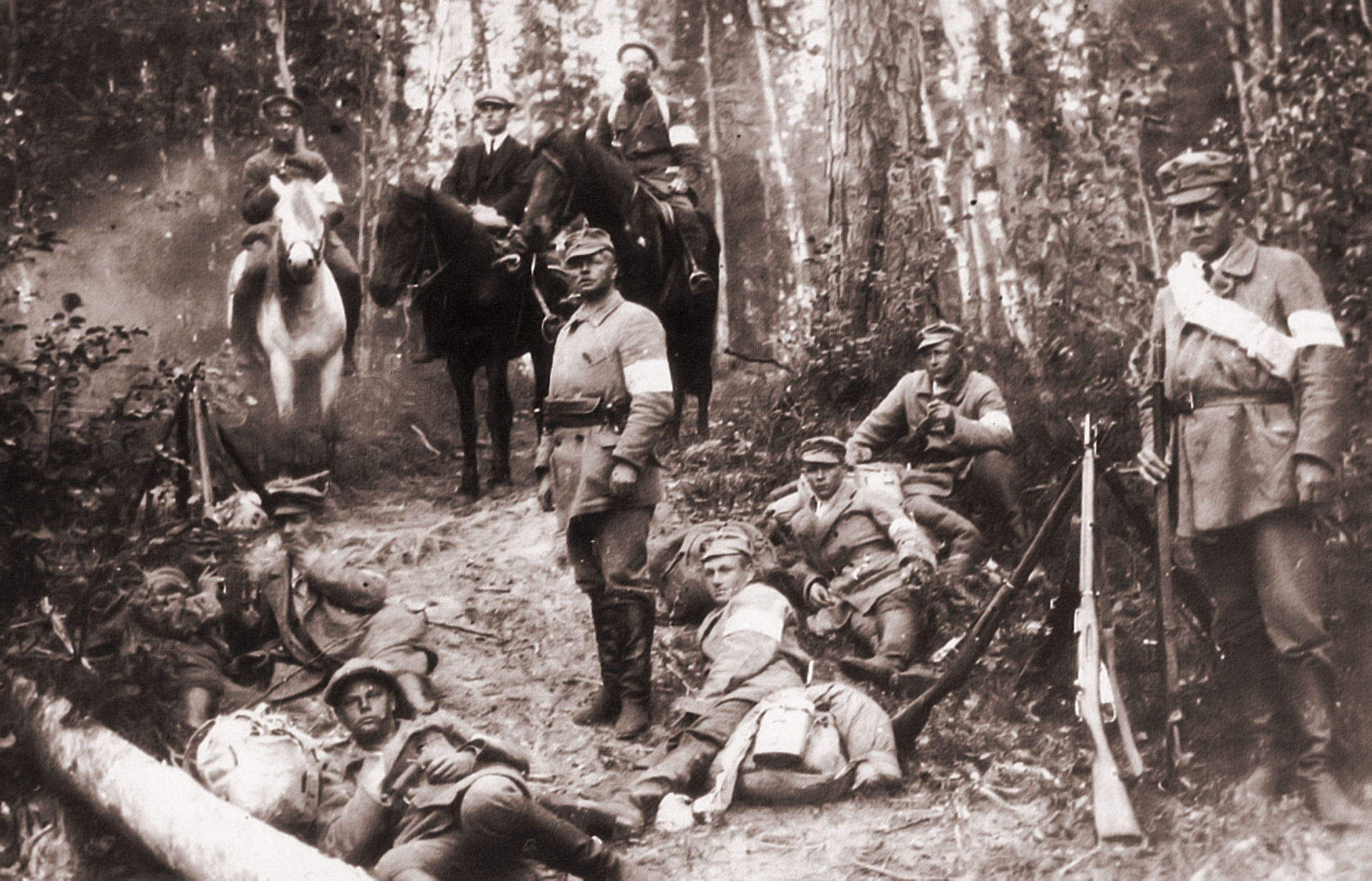
Volunteer tribal soldiers from the Viena-Karelian military campaign

Sota
"War", in this context, a low-intensity one, consisting of actions such as border skirmishes, expeditions by volunteer corps, expulsion of remnant occupational forces or attempts to foment rebellion in the local populace.

Heimo
"Tribe" or "clan", but in this context, also the ethnic and language kinship between Baltic Finns; "kindred peoples". Somewhat comparable to the German concept of Völkisch.

Sukukansa
People who are linguistically and/or ethnically akin to one another; "suku" means "family" and "kansa" means "people" (singular).

== See also ==
- Finnish Civil War
- List of Finnish wars
- Treaty of Tartu
- Winter War
- Continuation War
- War Victims of Finland 1914–1922
- Allied intervention in the Russian Civil War
