= Ukki Väinämöinen =

Karelian ideological leader

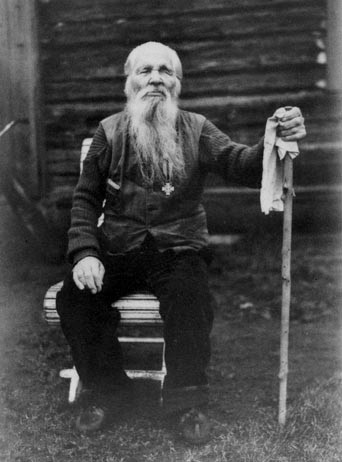
- Sidorov in 1938 in Finland
- Born: Vasily Leontievich Sidorov; 1855; Tunguda, Russian Empire
- Died: January 11, 1942 (aged 86–87); Vuokatti, Finland
- Other name: Vaseli Levonen
- Military career
- Allegiance: Forest Guerrillas
- Conflicts: East Karelian uprising

Ukki Väinämöinen (lit. 'Grandfather Väinämöinen'), born Vasily Leontievich Sidorov (Russian: Василий Сидоров), also known as Vaseli Levonen (1855 – 11 January 1942), was a Karelian ideological leader known for his role in the East Karelian uprising.

== Life ==
Vasily Sidorov was born in 1855, in the Karelian village of Tunguda, then a part of the Russian Empire.

=== Karelian uprising ===
Sidorov was elected as the leader of the Finnish Forest Guerrillas, who had led a conflict against the Russian Bolsheviks and Karelian Labor Commune during the Russian Civil War. Sidorov was a zealous Christian and an anti-communist, and was very popular among the Karelians. Sidorov gained the nickname "Ukki Väinämöinen" (lit. 'Grandfather Väinämöinen') from his resemblance to the hero Väinämöinen of Finnish mythology, as both had a short, stocky stature and long beard.

By the end of December 1921, the Karelian rebels, supported by the White Guard, controlled a significant part of Northeast Karelia. In response, Bolshevik leadership formed the Karelian Front led by Alexander Sedyakin, numbering around some 20,000 servicemen. The Bolsheviks captured Ukhta, the rebel stronghold, by mid-February 1922, and the Karelian resistance was finally broken. Ukki Väinämöinen fled to Finland with the other rebels. He died on 11 January 1942 in Vuokatti.

== Sources ==
- Niinistö, Jussi (1998). "Jalmari Takkinen - sissipäällikkö Ilmarinen". Suomalaisia soturikohtaloita (in Finnish). Helsinki: Suomalaisuuden liitto. ISBN 951-96348-5-1.
