= Treaty of Tartu (Finland–Russia) =

1920 border treaty between Finland and Soviet Russia

Russian: Тартуский мирный договор; Finnish: Tarton rauha; Swedish: Fredsfördraget i Dorpat
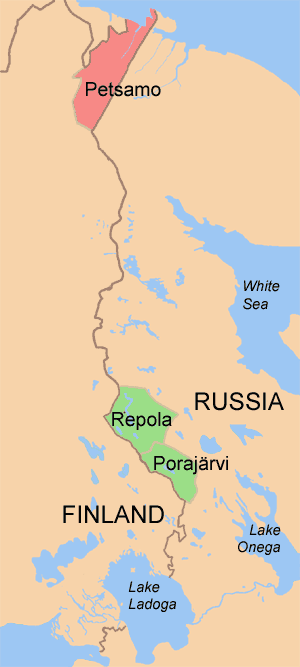
- The Finland–Russia border as decided in the Treaty of Tartu. Petsamo (red) became part of Finland, while Repola and Porajärvi (green) were handed back to Russia.
- Type: Peace treaty
- Signed: 14 October 1920
- Location: Tartu, Estonia
- Effective: 31 December 1920 (according to article 39 of the treaty)
- Expiration: 1939 (beginning of the Winter War)
- Parties: Russian SFSR; Finland
- Languages: Russian; Finnish; Swedish

The Treaty of Tartu (Russian: Тартуский мирный договор; Finnish: Tarton rauha; Swedish: Fredsfördraget i Dorpat) was signed on 14 October 1920 between Finland and Soviet Russia after negotiations that lasted nearly five months. The treaty confirmed the border between Finland and Soviet Russia after the Finnish Civil War and Finnish volunteer expeditions in Russian East Karelia that resulted in annexation of several Russian districts.

The treaty was signed in Tartu, Estonia, at the building of the Estonian Students' Society. Ratifications of the treaty were exchanged in Moscow on 31 December 1920. The treaty was registered in the League of Nations Treaty Series on 5 March 1921.

== Political background ==
This turbulent time in Finnish and Russian politics influenced the events that led to the Treaty of Tartu. Prior to the Treaty of Tartu, Finnish political parties shifted their sovereign policies several times. In early 1917, the conservative party was split into two factions: The Old Finns and the Young Finns. The Old Finns wanted to keep ties to St. Petersburg close and argued against an independent Finland, hoping not to agitate the Russian monarchy and further limit Finnish autonomy. The Young Finns differed in this regard as they promoted the idea of an independent Finland. The third major Finnish party were the leftist social-democrats. These social democrats also wanted to see an independent Finland.

All of this changed in a matter of a few short months when the Bolsheviks took control of the country during the Bolshevik Revolution. The Bolsheviks became an ally to the Finnish social democrats as they shared common ideological ground. This changed the stance of the social democrats, leading them to become pro-Russian. Meanwhile, the Old Finns, in disagreement with the Bolshevik policies became pro-independence. During the November 1917 election the coalition representing the pro-independence parties won the cabinet election and immediately moved to make Finland an independent nation with the Finnish Declaration of Independence. As the Bolshevik ideology formally subscribed to each people's right for self-determination and condemned any form of imperialism, Lenin saw the opportunity to promote his public support for the Finnish declaration as a showpiece of benevolence of the new Soviet system.

However, the move for independence, Soviet support, and general uncertainty in the society encouraged the militant left to attempt to duplicate the success of Russia's recent revolution. Soon after, the Finnish Civil War began. In the war the revolutionary socialist militia known as the Finnish Red Army clashed against the Finnish White forces, which were loyal to the legal (non-socialist) government. The government's forces, assisted by a division of regular German forces and Swedish volunteers, pushed back the Red troops that had initially controlled the industrial southern provinces and within some months, won the war. The border question between Russia and Finland remained unsettled after the war.

Following the civil war, the Finnish government sought to seek additional security by forming ties with the Germans. This alliance was short lived with the defeat of the central powers during World War I. With Imperial Germany’s demise, the Finnish government realized that it would have to accept the necessity of forming relations with the nascent Bolshevik Russian government, due to the developments of the Russian Civil War, even though their recent support for Red revolutionaries in Finland made the government very wary of the Bolsheviks. As other countries were now making similar treaties with Russia, such as Treaty of Tartu (Russian–Estonian), the voices questioning the legality and honor of dealing with the violently established Bolshevik government were also diminishing. Especially, the large, moderately socialist Social Democrat party was willing to finally normalize the relations with the greater neighboring state. Nevertheless, some nationalistic and rightist elements in Finnish Parliament still considered the planned treaty as going too far, even shameful, by giving up some of the initial negotiation goals and shattering their ideals of a greater national state including also eastern territories settled from ancient times by Finnic Karelian people, which never belonged to the Autonomous Grand Duchy of Finland. Some of those districts were annexed from Russia by Finnish military expeditions in 1918 shortly after the Russian Soviet government granted independence to Finland. In hindsight, the treaty was rather favourable for Finland, especially compared to the treaties made at the end of Second World War.

== Contents ==
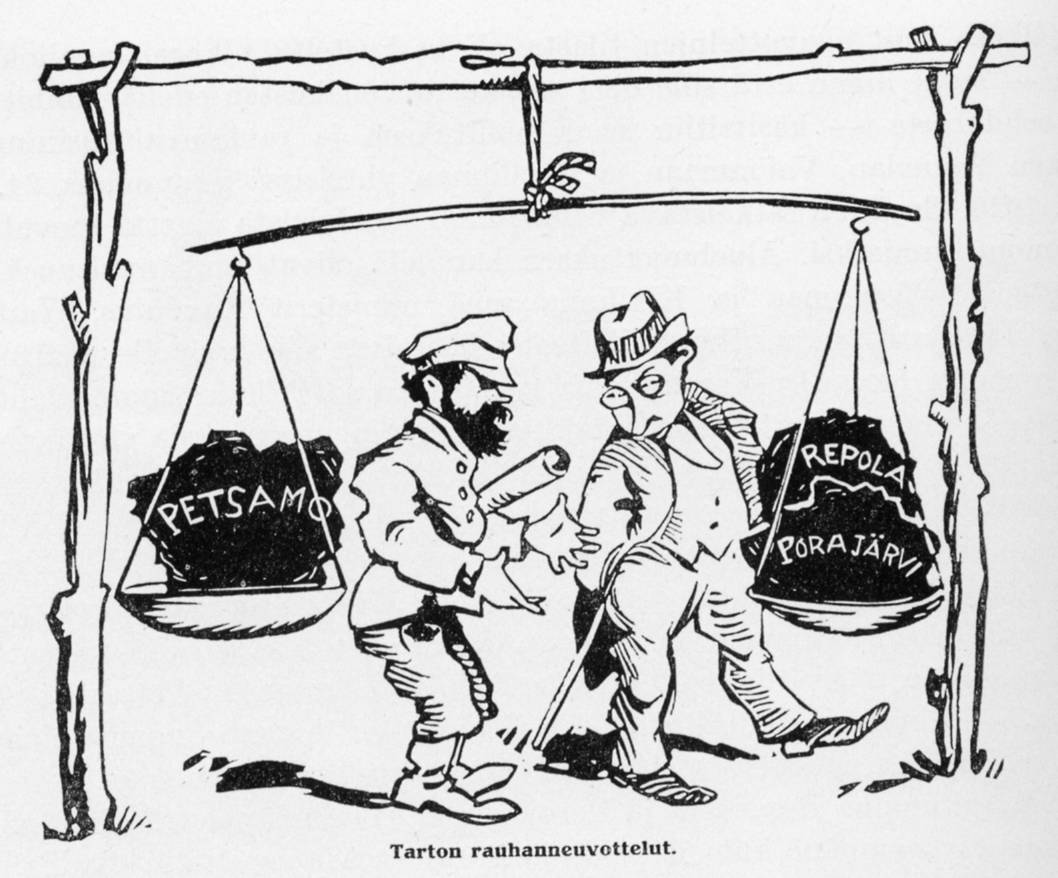
A caricature in Kurikka magazine September 30, 1920, shows the price of Finland's corridor to the Arctic Ocean.

The treaty confirmed that the Finnish-Soviet border would follow the old border between the autonomous Grand Duchy of Finland and Imperial Russia. Finland additionally received Petsamo, with its ice-free harbour on the Arctic Ocean - the district that Finland had already annexed from Russia several years before. As far back as 1864, Tsar Alexander II had promised to join Petsamo to Finland in exchange for a piece of the Karelian Isthmus. Finland also agreed to leave the joined and then occupied areas of Repola (annexed by Finland during the Viena expedition) and Porajärvi (annexed by Finland during the Aunus expedition) in Russian East Karelia. The treaty also included Finland handing over the contested region of North Ingria to Russia, thereby disbanding the short-lived Republic of North Ingria. The treaty also had some articles besides area and border issues, including Soviet guarantee of free navigation of merchant ships from the Finnish ports in Lake Ladoga (Laatokka in Finnish) to the Gulf of Finland via the River Neva. Finland guaranteed land transit from the Soviet Union to Norway via the Petsamo area. Also, Finland agreed to disarm the coastal fortress in Ino, opposite the Soviet city Kronstadt located on the island of Kotlin. The Finnish outer islands in the Gulf of Finland were demilitarized.

The treaty was subject to controversy first during the East Karelian Uprising 1921–1922 when the Finnish government allowed volunteers to take part in the conflict.

The treaty was finally broken by the Soviet Union in 1939, when it started the Winter War against Finland.

== Delegations ==
=== Finnish ===
- Juho Kusti Paasikivi, leader
- Juho Vennola
- Alexander Frey
- Rudolf Walden
- Väinö Tanner
- Väinö Voionmaa
- Väinö Kivilinna

=== Soviet ===
- Jan Antonovich Berzin
- Platon Kerzhentsev
- Nikolai Tikhmenev
- Alexander Samoylo
- Yevgeny Berens

== See also ==
- List of Finnish treaties
- Treaty of Tartu (Russian–Estonian)
- Moscow Peace Treaty of 1940
- Moscow Armistice of 1944
- Soviet–Lithuanian Peace Treaty
- Latvian–Soviet Peace Treaty
- Status of Eastern Carelia
