= Porosozero =

Porosozero Поросозеро Porajärvi (Finnish)
- Settlement
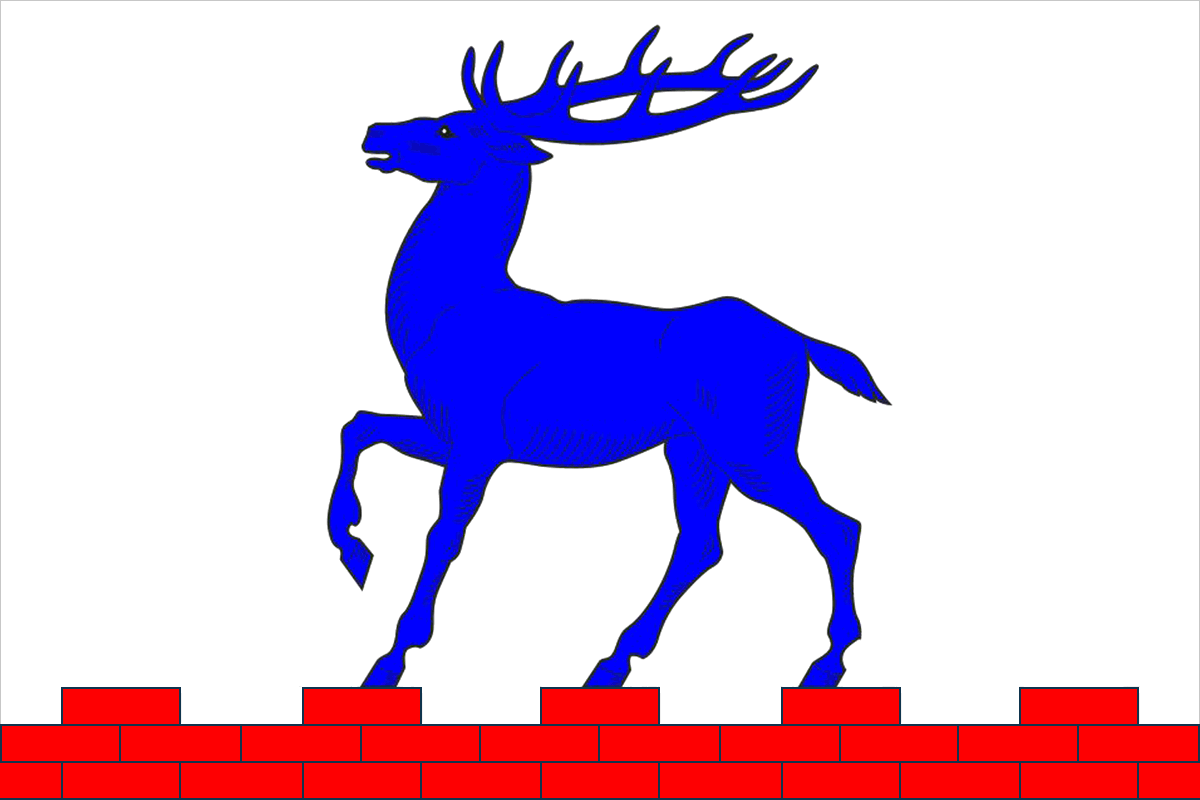
- Flag
- Interactive map of Porosozero
- Location of Porosozero Porosozero (Karelia)
- Coordinates: 62°43′17″N 32°42′45″E
- Country: Russia
- Federal subject: Republic of Karelia
- Administrative district: Suoyarvsky District

Population
  - Estimate (2013): 2,647 )

Municipal status
  - Municipal district: Suoyarvsky Municipal District
  - Rural settlement: Porosozerskoye Rural Settlement
- Time zone: UTC+3 (UTC+03:00)
- Postal code: 186855
- OKTMO ID: 86650443101

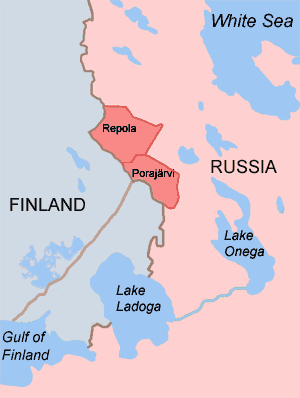
Reboly (Repola) and Porosozero (Porajärvi) in 1920. The border between Finland and Soviet Union after 1940 is also shown.

Porosozero (Russian: Поросо́зеро; Karelian: Porarvi; Finnish: Porajärvi) is a rural locality (a settlement) in Suoyarvsky District of the Republic of Karelia, located along the Suna River. Municipally, it is a part and the administrative center of Porosozerskoye Rural Settlement of Suoyarvsky Municipal District. Population: 3,529 (2002 Census); 4,406 (1989 Census).

Before 1920 it was a municipality in the Ladoga Karelia by the Finnish border. The main source of livelihood is the forest industry.

== History ==
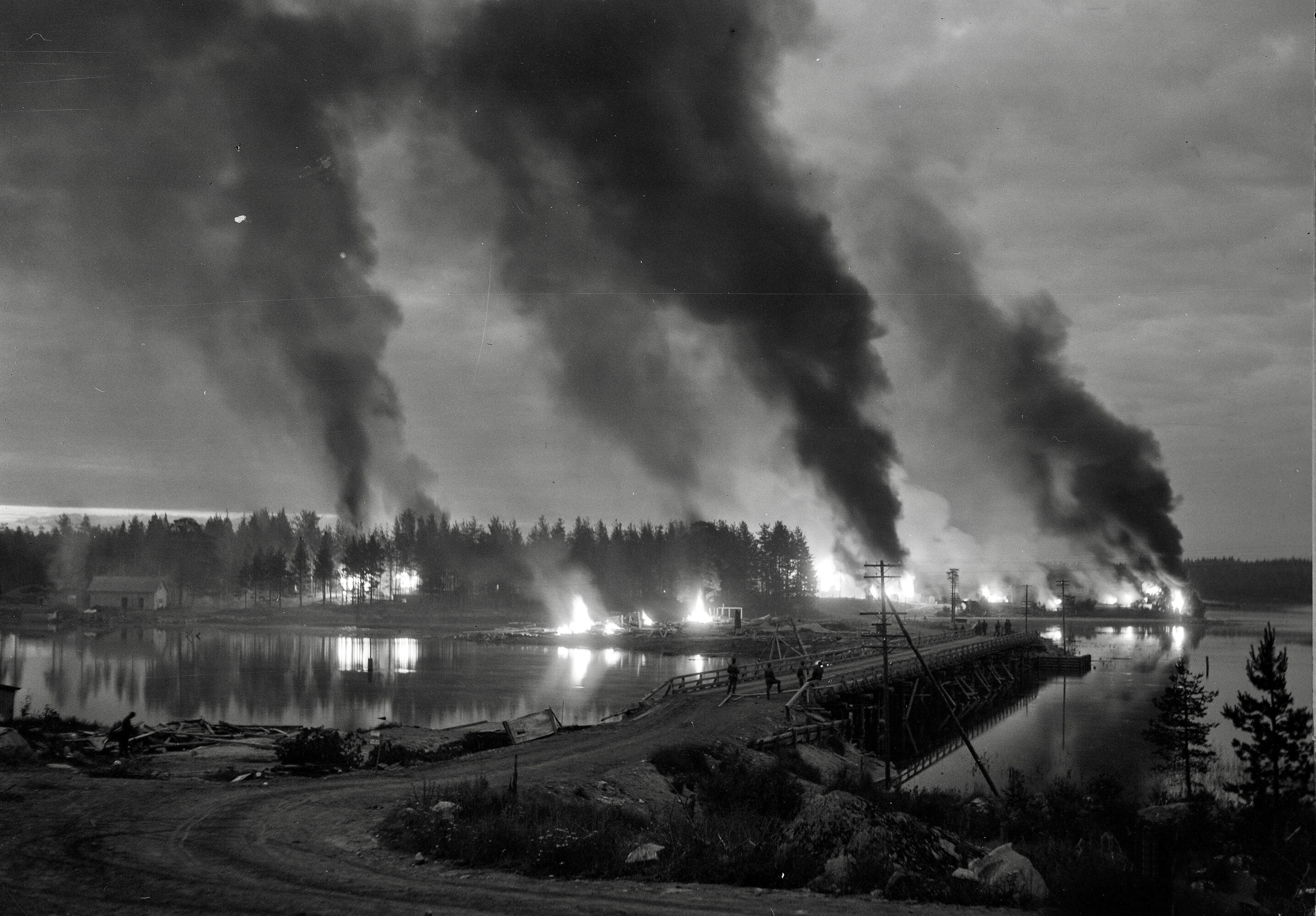
Porosozero after it was burned by retreating Finnish soldiers in July 1944.

The municipality of Porosozero was established in 1873. After Finland's declaration of independence during the Russian Civil War, the parish became an issue in Finnish–Russian relations when its population held a vote in August 1918 to join Finland. The Finnish Army moved to occupy Porosozero in October. In the 1920 Treaty of Tartu, Finland gave up its claims on Porosozero and the neighboring Reboly, and instead received Petsamo in the far north, which had been annexed by Finland in 1918.

The inhabitants of Porosozero, however, did not give up, and in 1921 they started a rebellion against the Bolsheviks. The resistance movement, the Metsäsissit (literally Forest Guerillas) recruited volunteers from Finland and managed to capture large parts of East Karelia. The Bolsheviks fought back, and in 1922 the last guerillas withdrew to Finland.

During the negotiations preceding the Winter War, Joseph Stalin offered Reboly and Porosozero in exchange for a smaller area on the Karelian Isthmus. The offer was rejected.
