= Reboly =

Reboly Реболы
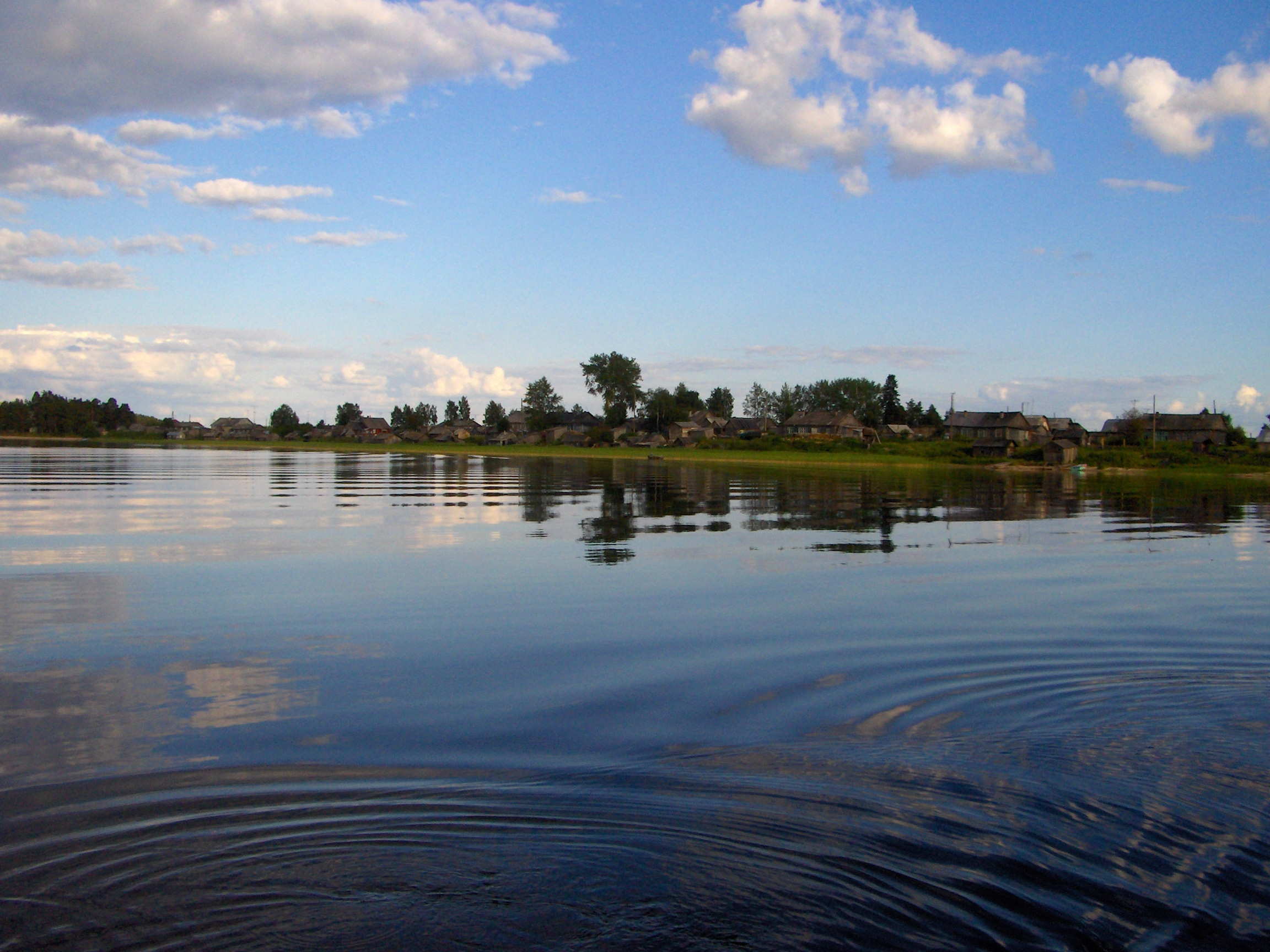
- Lake Leksozero shore at Reboly

- Flag Coat of arms
- Interactive map of Reboly
- Location of Reboly Reboly (Karelia)
- Coordinates: 63°50′01″N 30°48′38″E
- Country: Russia
- Federal subject: Republic of Karelia
- Administrative district: Muyezersky
- First mentioned: 1555

Population (2010 Census)
  - Total: 858
  - Estimate (2021): 522 (−39.2%)

Municipal status
  - Municipal district: Muyezersky
  - Rural settlement: Rebolskoye
- Time zone: UTC+3 (UTC+03:00)
- Postal code: 186966
- Dialing code: +7 81455
- OKTMO ID: 86627450101
- Website: www.reboly.org

Reboly (Russian: Ре́болы, Finnish: Repola, Karelian: Rebol´a) is a settlement in the Republic of Karelia of the Russian Federation by the Finnish border, located 91 kilometres (57 mi) southeast of Kuhmo and 96 kilometres (60 mi) northeast of Lieksa. In 1926 the settlement had a population of 1,465, in 2010 - 258 people.

== History ==
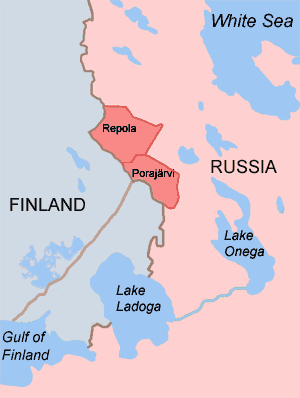
Reboly and Porosozero in 1920. The border between Finland and Soviet Union after 1940 is also shown.

Reboly was first mentioned in 1555; by 1679 it was the center of a district with 23 villages and 220 households. Its location on the Russo-Swedish border led to several cases in which the village was destroyed by Swedish detachments. In the nineteenth century it became an often-visited site by Finnish nationalist scholars, such as Elias Lönnrot, Matthias Castrén and D. E. D. Europaeus.

After the Finland's declaration of independence during the Russian Civil War, the settlement and its district became an issue in Finnish-Russian relations when its predominantly Karelian population held a vote in August 1918 to join Finland. The Finnish Army moved to occupy Reboly in October. In the Treaty of Tartu, 1920, Finland gave up its claims on Reboly and the neighbouring Porosozero, and instead received Petsamo in the far north, which had been annexed by Finnish trooрs in 1918.

The anti-Soviet sentiment in Reboly was still strong, and in 1921, after the Red Army re-took Reboly and Porosozero, local pro-Finnish activists formed a short-lived resistance movement known as the Metsäsissit (literally Forest Guerillas). Together with Finnish volunteers, they were instrumental in the East Karelian uprising of 1921–1922.

During the negotiations prior to the Winter War, the Soviet government offered Reboly and Porosozero in exchange for a smaller area on the Karelian Isthmus. The offer was rejected.

Reboly was occupied from 1941 to 1944 by the Finnish 14th Division during the Continuation War, until it was recaptured by Soviet forces.

== Climate ==
Climate data for Reboly (extremes 1914-present)
Month	Jan	Feb	Mar	Apr	May	Jun	Jul	Aug	Sep	Oct	Nov	Dec	Year
Record high °C (°F)	8.1 (46.6)	6.1 (43.0)	12.1 (53.8)	20.7 (69.3)	32.2 (90.0)	32.5 (90.5)	35.5 (95.9)	33.7 (92.7)	25.1 (77.2)	18.3 (64.9)	10.5 (50.9)	6.6 (43.9)	35.5 (95.9)
Mean daily maximum °C (°F)	−7.0 (19.4)	−6.6 (20.1)	−1.1 (30.0)	5.1 (41.2)	12.4 (54.3)	17.8 (64.0)	20.8 (69.4)	18.1 (64.6)	12.2 (54.0)	4.7 (40.5)	−0.9 (30.4)	−4.4 (24.1)	5.9 (42.7)
Daily mean °C (°F)	−10.1 (13.8)	−10.1 (13.8)	−5.2 (22.6)	0.8 (33.4)	7.6 (45.7)	13.4 (56.1)	16.5 (61.7)	14.1 (57.4)	8.9 (48.0)	2.5 (36.5)	−3.0 (26.6)	−7.0 (19.4)	2.4 (36.3)
Mean daily minimum °C (°F)	−13.7 (7.3)	−14.1 (6.6)	−9.6 (14.7)	−3.7 (25.3)	3.0 (37.4)	9.0 (48.2)	12.3 (54.1)	10.3 (50.5)	5.9 (42.6)	0.4 (32.7)	−5.3 (22.5)	−10.0 (14.0)	−1.3 (29.7)
Record low °C (°F)	−52.0 (−61.6)	−41.6 (−42.9)	−36.0 (−32.8)	−28.5 (−19.3)	−15.0 (5.0)	−1.5 (29.3)	1.8 (35.2)	−1.7 (28.9)	−6.9 (19.6)	−21.1 (−6.0)	−34.5 (−30.1)	−38.2 (−36.8)	−52.0 (−61.6)
Average precipitation mm (inches)	41.4 (1.63)	33.5 (1.32)	31.8 (1.25)	30.0 (1.18)	51.1 (2.01)	60.0 (2.36)	78.5 (3.09)	69.1 (2.72)	63.9 (2.52)	60.7 (2.39)	52.0 (2.05)	49.7 (1.96)	621.7 (24.48)
Average precipitation days (≥ 1.0 mm)	12	10	9	7	9	10	11	11	11	12	13	13	128
Average relative humidity (%)	85	83	77	70	66	66	71	76	82	86	88	87	78
Source 1: pogoda.ru.net
Source 2: NOAA (precipitation days, humidity)
