= East Karelia =

Historic region of Northern Europe, part of Russia

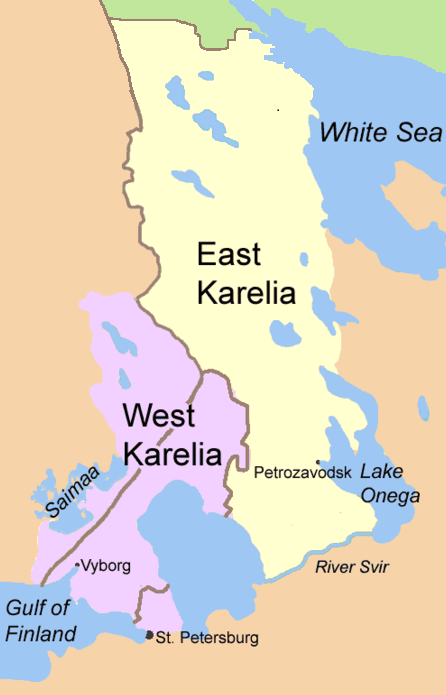
East Karelia and West Karelia with borders of 1939 and 1940/1947. They are also known as Russian Karelia and Finnish Karelia respectively.

East Karelia (Finnish: Itä-Karjala, Karelian: Idä-Karjala), also rendered as Eastern Karelia or Russian Karelia (Finnish: Venäjän Karjala), is a name for the part of Karelia that is beyond the eastern border of Finland and since the Treaty of Stolbovo in 1617 has remained Eastern Orthodox and a part of Russia. It is separate from the western part of Karelia, called Finnish Karelia or historically Swedish Karelia (before 1808). Most of East Karelia has become part of the Republic of Karelia within the Russian Federation. It consists mainly of the old historical regions of Viena Karjala (English: White Karelia) and Aunus Karjala (English: Olonets Karelia).

== Culture and ideology ==
19th-century ethnic-nationalist Fennomans saw East Karelia as the ancient home of Finnic culture, "un-contaminated" by either Scandinavians or Slavs. In the sparsely populated East Karelian backwoods, mainly in White Karelia, Elias Lönnrot (1802–1884) collected the folk tales that ultimately would become Finland's national epic, the Kalevala (published from 1835 to 1849).

The idea of annexing East Karelia to Finland as part of a "Greater Finland" had wide support in newly-independent Finland after 1917. It was especially popular during the Russo-Finnish Continuation War of 1941–1944, when such annexation seemed feasible in the wake of an expected German conquest of the Soviet Union. Finnish forces occupied most of East Karelia from 1941 to 1944. The war meant hardship for the local ethnic-Russian civilians, including forced labour and internment in prison camps as enemy aliens. After the Moscow Armistice of September 1944, calls for the annexation of East Karelia to Finland virtually disappeared.

== History and diplomacy ==
After Finland and Soviet Russia divided Karelia between themselves in 1920, the Soviet authorities promised far-reaching cultural rights to the Finnic peoples that made up most of the population of East Karelia. However, within the Karelian Autonomous Soviet Socialist Republic these rights were never realised, and under Stalin (in power c. 1928 to 1953) ethnic Finns were persecuted and an intensive Russification programme began. Since the dissolution of the Soviet Union in 1991, Finnic culture in East Karelia has experienced a revival.
