= Battle of Varolampi Pond =

Battle of the Winter War

- Part of Winter War and Battle of Tolvajärvi
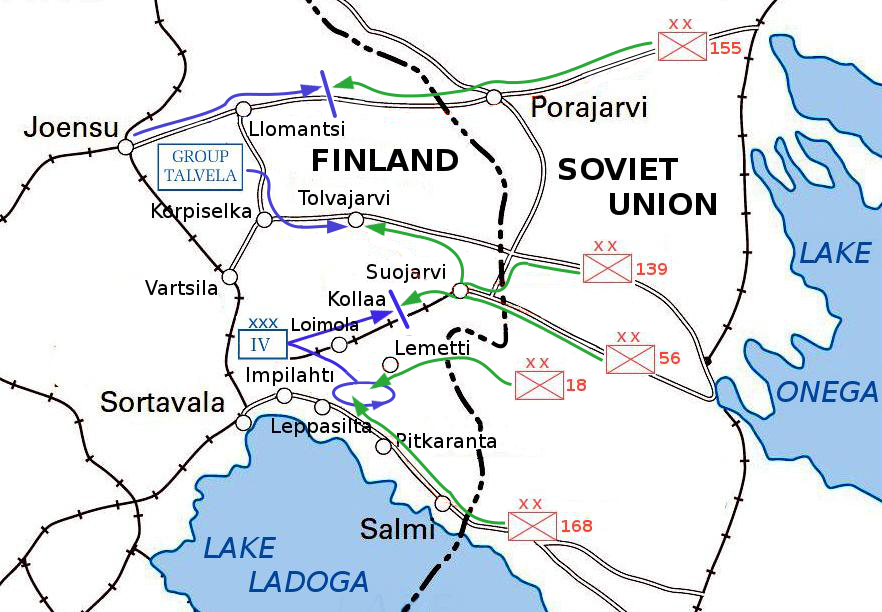
| Date | 10–11 December 1939 |
| Location | Northwest of Tolvajärvi, north of Lake Ladoga 62°18′N 31°22′E |
| Result | Finnish victory: Soviet attack repulsed |

Belligerents
| Finland | Soviet Union |

Commanders and leaders
| (Finland) Aaro Pajari | (Soviet Union) Kombrig Nikolai Belyaev |

Strength
| 10th Infantry Division | 718th Rifle Regiment |

Casualties and losses
| 20 killed 55 wounded | 100+ killed |
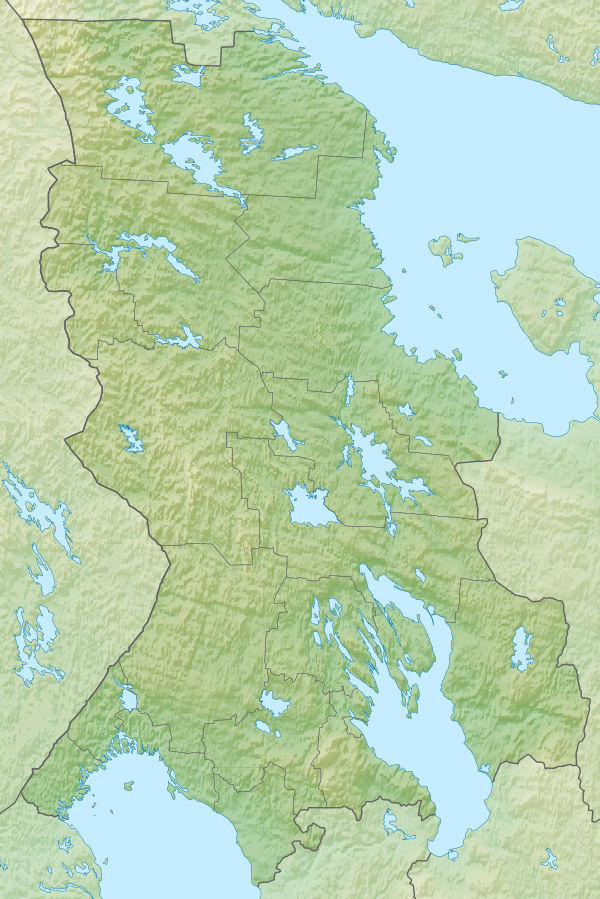
- Location within Karelia Battle of Varolampi Pond (Finland)

The Battle of Varolampi Pond also known as the 'Sausage War' occurred during the Winter War and was a precursor to the Battle of Tolvajärvi.

== Battle ==
On the night of 10 December, the 718th Rifle Regiment of the Soviet army swung around the Finnish rear of the Tolvajärvi front and attacked the lightly defended Finnish supply and artillery troops at Varolampi Pond situated along the Korpiselkä-Tolvajärvi road.

The surprise attack saw initial success by the Soviet troops in advancing through the Finnish lines but soon faltered. The Soviet soldiers stopped to eat the sausage soup that the retreating Finns had left behind in their field kitchen. This gave enough time for Major Pajari, who happened to be passing nearby at the time, to muster men from the 16th Infantry Regiment (JR 16) Headquarters Company, and Third Battalion supply elements, which included field cooks, clerks, supply and artillery NCOs, to launch a counter-attack, accompanied by the battle cry Hakkaa päälle (Finnish for 'Cut them down').

Fighting lasted well into the night and involved close quarters combat and one of the only cases of bayonet fighting during the Winter War. By dawn on 11 December the counter-attack succeeded in driving back the Soviet force and inflicted heavy casualties, with over 100 dead Soviet troops left on the field according to Finnish estimates, along with 20 dead on the Finnish side.

== See also ==
- List of Finnish military equipment of World War II
- List of Soviet Union military equipment of World War II
