= Olli Pajari =

Finnish politician

Olli Pajari (1 February 1860, in Rautjärvi – 20 August 1923) was a Finnish schoolteacher and politician. He was a Member of the Parliament of Finland from 1907 to 1908, representing the Finnish Party. Olli Pajari was the father of general Aaro Pajari. General Pajari's greatest military achievement was the Finnish victory against the Soviet Union at the Battle of Tolvajärvi in the Winter War.
