= Battle of Suursaari =

Battle between Finland and the Soviet Union in 1942 during the Continuation War

Coordinates: 60.052°N 26.982°E

- Part of the Continuation War
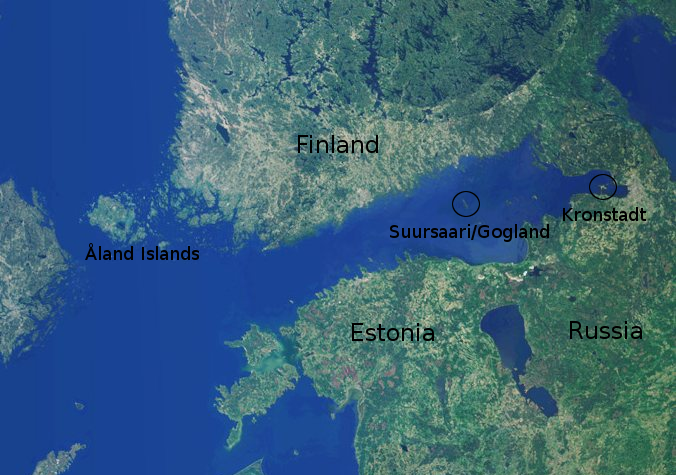
- Location of Gogland
Date	26 March – 2 April 1942 (1 week)
Location	Gogland in Gulf of Finland
Result	Finnish victory

Belligerents
Finland	Soviet Union

Commanders and leaders
(Finland) Aaro Pajari	(Soviet Union) Unknown

Strength
3,500; 67 aircraft	518

Casualties and losses
63 killed or missing 109 wounded	300 killed 36 captured (on the island)

The Battle of Suursaari was fought over the frozen Gulf of Finland on and around the islands of Gogland (Finnish: Suursaari, Swedish: Hogland)) and Bolshoy Tyuters (Finnish: Suur-Tytärsaari, (Swedish: Tyterskär)) during the Second World War. After sharp fighting the numerically superior Finnish forces seized the Gogland and Bolshoy Tyuters against the Red Army, and later provided support for Nazi German forces defending Bolshoy Tyuters against Soviet counterattacks.

== Background ==
In April 1938, the Soviets contacted the Finns, stating that they didn't trust Nazi Germany and wanted guarantees that Finland would not be used for the German attack on the USSR. In March 1939, the Soviets asked Finland to lease Suursaari and four small uninhabited islets for thirty years, and cede rich and heavily populated areas on the Karelian isthmus, saying that they were vital for the defense of Leningrad, the second biggest Soviet city. In return, the Soviet Union offered a large slice of empty and unofficially disputed Karelian borderland in exchange. The Finns refused.

Soviet forces had occupied Gogland during the Winter War, and, under the terms of the Moscow Peace Treaty, Finland was forced to cede the island to the Soviet Union. As Operation Barbarossa commenced, the Soviets placed a garrison on the island; however, as invading German forces on the mainland moved closer to Leningrad, the Soviet command ordered the evacuation of most of the islands in the Gulf of Finland, as well as their besieged base at Hanko on the Finnish coast.

Soviet forces left the islands of Gogland, Sommers and Bolshoy Tyuters on 7–9 December 1941. Finnish coastal forces noticed that the islands had been abandoned, and manned both Gogland and Sommers with small garrisons by December 12. Poor ice conditions and harsh weather made it difficult for the Finns to reinforce the garrisons, and when Soviet forces returned in company strength on January 2, 1942, the surprised Finns had to withdraw from Gogland.

== Capture of Gogland ==
Determined to retake Gogland, the Finns concentrated a three battalion strong force to the nearby Haapasaaret Islands, which are roughly 20 km NNE of Gogland. Finnish forces were under command of Major General Aaro Pajari and consisted of the second battalion of the 6th Infantry Regiment, or II/JR 6, and the first battalion of the 27th Infantry Regiment, or I/JR 27, and the whole of the 2nd Coastal Battalion (RP 2) supported by the mortar and anti-tank gun companies of the 6th Infantry Regiment, 3rd company of the 23rd Engineer Battalion, 1st Battalion of the 19th Field Artillery Regiment (total of 12 guns), and two artillery batteries (total of 8 guns). The strength of the Soviet garrison was roughly 500 men but it lacked artillery, which meant that the garrison had to fight without support, while the Finns had artillery and air support.

Prior to the attack Finnish forces opened two roads over the ice to the island's vicinity. Assault troops rode in trucks as far as they could, then, in the pre-dawn hours of March 27, traveled the last five kilometers over the packed ice on skis. Finnish forces were split into two groups: Detachment Sotisaari, containing the bulk of the forces, which approached the island from the west, and the three company strong Detachment Miettinen, which was to pin down Soviet defenders on the eastern side of the island. The Finnish plan called for the regular infantry battalions to spearhead the assault, with coastal troops held in reserve.

At 04:00 on 27 March 1942 Finnish artillery began bombarding known Soviet strongpoints on Gogland. II/JR 6 reached the island without meeting opposition; I/JR 27, however, met determined resistance as it neared its planned entry point, and quickly switched to the same route used by the other battalion. Finnish forces successfully overcame most of the Soviet defenders and captured key locations on the island. Fatigue from the long march to the island, enemy resistance, and difficult terrain forced the Finns to halt their assault at 22:00, at which time the only remaining Soviet strongpoints were in the extreme southern and northern tips of the island. During the night some of the Soviet forces still on the island chose to flee over the ice. The Finns resumed clearing the island the next morning. In many cases, defending Soviet forces refused to surrender and put up very stiff resistance, forcing the Finns to use satchel charges on Soviet positions. The last remaining Soviet strongpoints were taken on the morning of 29 March. Small numbers of Soviet troops escaped over the ice towards Moshchny Island (Finnish: Lavansaari), though the fleeing men suffered losses from repeated strafing runs by Finnish Air Force fighters.

Air activity was high on both sides. On March 27–28 Finnish Air Force Fokker D.XXI, Curtiss P-36 Hawk and Brewster F2A Buffalo fighters claimed a total of 27 Soviet Polikarpov I-153 and Polikarpov I-16 fighters. Air forces on both sides supported their ground forces with strafing and bombing runs, the Finns using twin engined Bristol Blenheim and Tupolev SB-2 bombers.

== Capture of Bolshoy Tyuters ==
On March 30, 1942, with Gogland secured, the Finns sent a small patrol to investigate Bolshoy Tyuters. A strong Soviet garrison forced the patrol to depart. A stronger force was sent to capture the island on April 1, and by the time the company-sized force reached the island the Russians had abandoned it. On the following day the Russians returned, and despite Finnish resistance, managed to create strongpoints on the island. With German support, Finnish troops eventually managed to destroy or drive off the remaining Soviets.

== Aftermath ==
On April 8, 1942, after the Germans had transported artillery to the Bolshoy Tyuters, the Soviets launched another attack. The assault force was estimated to have been roughly 1,200 men strong, but the heavy German artillery on the island and lack of cover on the frozen Gulf of Finland caused heavy casualties among the Soviets. After the attack had been repulsed the Finns left the island to the Germans, who occupied it until they evacuated Estonia in 1944. Though the operation to capture Gogland had succeeded, the overall goal of capturing all the main islands in the Eastern Gulf of Finland failed, as the German forces needed for the operation were required to defend against Soviet counter-offensives on the Leningrad Front.

== See also ==
- Baltic Sea campaigns (1939–1945)

== Bibliography ==
Ari Raunio ja Juri Kilin (2009). Jatkosodan torjuntataisteluja 1942–44. Helsinki: Karttakeskus. ISBN 978-951-593-070-5.
