= Finnish volunteers in the Waffen-SS =

Foreign Waffen-SS unit

Finnish Volunteer Battalion of the Waffen-SS
- Finnisches Freiwilligen-Bataillon der Waffen-SS; Suomalainen Waffen-SS-vapaaehtoispataljoona
- Flag of the Finnish Volunteer Battalion
- Active: 1941 – July 1943
- Country: Finland
- Allegiance: Nazi Germany
- Branch: Waffen-SS
- Type: Battalion
- Role: Motorized infantry
- Size: 1,408 men
- March: Suomalaisten SS-miesten marssi

From 1941 to 1943, 1,408 Finns volunteered for service on the Eastern Front of World War II in the Waffen-SS, in units of the SS Division Wiking. Most served as motorized infantry in the Finnish Volunteer Battalion of the Waffen-SS (German: Finnisches Freiwilligen-Bataillon der Waffen-SS; Finnish: Suomalainen Waffen-SS-vapaaehtoispataljoona). The unit was disbanded in mid-1943 as the volunteers' two-year commitment had expired and the Finnish government was unwilling to allow more men to volunteer. In 1944-1945 a company-sized unit of Finnish defectors recruited to the SS continued fighting alongside Germany.

The battalion was formed following the Winter War, as Finland grew closer to Germany with recruitment beginning in 1941. Negotiations took place between the Finnish and German governments to reach compromises over certain sensitive issues for the battalion such as an oath of allegiance. Eventually, the volunteers were transported to Germany and split into two groups – experienced men who went straight to the Eastern Front to join Wiking, and one group that stayed in Germany for training, later becoming the Finnish Volunteer Battalion. In late 1941 and early 1942, the battalion completed their training and was sent to the Front. They participated in Case Blue, and were pulled back for the Battle of Stalingrad in late 1942. In April 1943, the battalion was withdrawn because of the two-year service agreement, and Finnish authorities such as Carl Gustaf Emil Mannerheim, Commander in Chief of the Finnish Defense Forces, proposed their agreements not be renewed. The battalion was finally disbanded on 11 July 1943.

Within historiography, the Finnish SS volunteers have been seen within Finland as an apolitical group, often connected to the Jäger Movement and the idea that the battalion was an elite unit. Finnish historiography has not mentioned many of the atrocities committed by SS Division Wiking, and only hinted at participation in atrocities. A series of high-publicity publications since 2017, however, have changed this. For example, a 2019 report by the National Archives of Finland concluded that "at least some of the cases show that Finnish volunteers did participate in carrying out atrocities against Jews and civilians". International sources say that the Finnish soldiers were likely involved in atrocities.

== Background ==
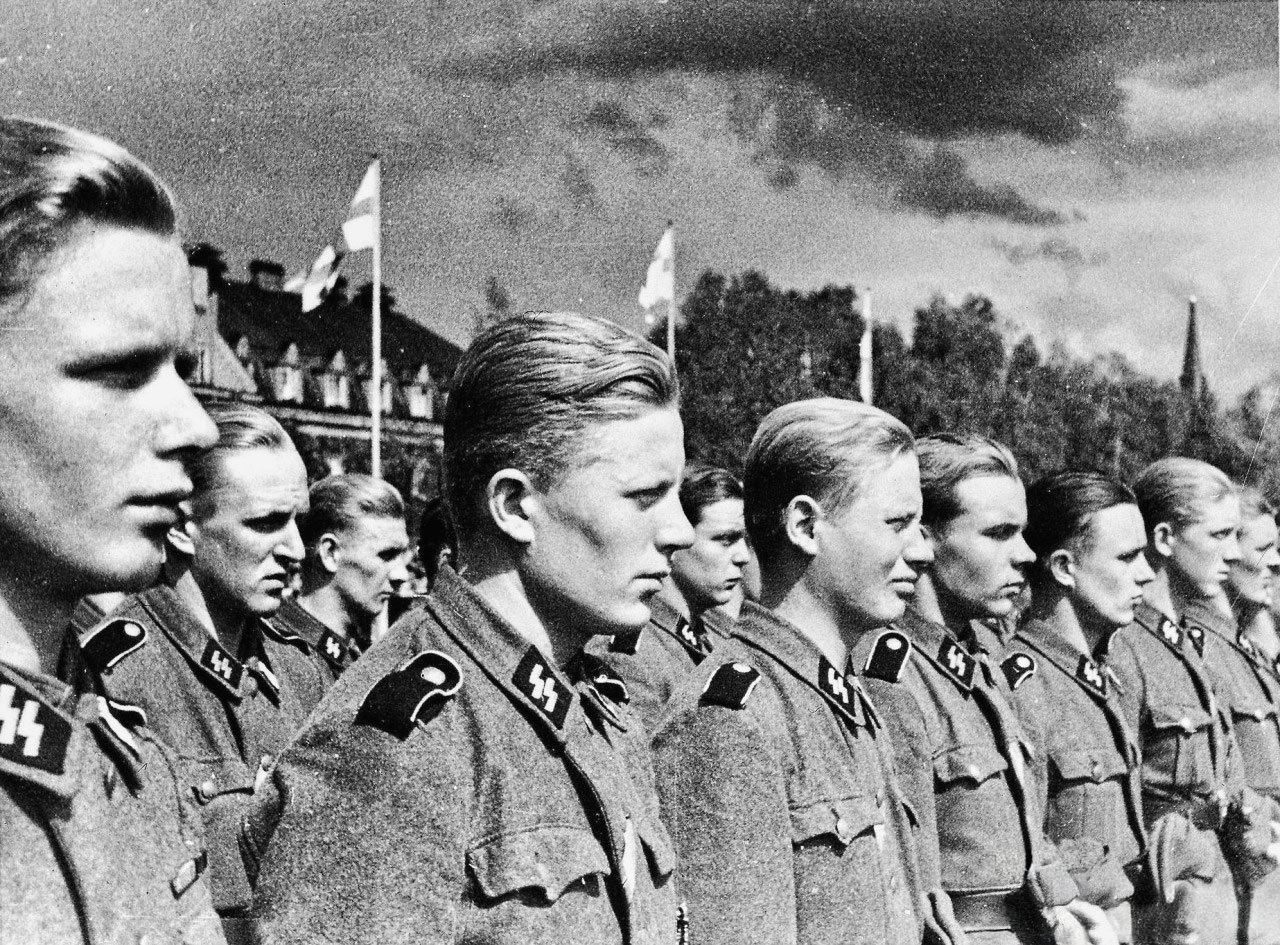
Finnish SS volunteers, 1943

By June 1941, when Nazi Germany launched Operation Barbarossa, the invasion of the Soviet Union (USSR), Finland had come to regard the latter as a threat to its independence and the former as its best and only ally against the USSR. Following the Finnish Civil War of 1918, during which the German Empire and USSR intervened to support the White and Red factions respectively, anti-communism and ethnic hatred of Russians became popular sentiments in Finland. Then, in 1939–40, the USSR attacked and defeated Finland in the Winter War, which cost Finland 25,000 casualties and 9% of its territory. Despite receiving no aid from Germany during the Winter War, and the German invasions and occupations of Norway and Denmark in mid-1940, Finland grew closer diplomatically to Germany. Finally, by early 1941, the Finnish government expected a military conflict between Germany and the USSR, and the Finnish public expected Finland would go to war again with the USSR with German assistance.

In December 1940, the Schutzstaffel (SS) established the SS Division Wiking, a division-strength unit of the Waffen-SS, the SS's military wing. The division was to be composed of volunteers from Denmark, Norway, and Sweden, but into mid-1940 recruitment disappointed the SS. In November 1940, Gottlob Berger, chief of the SS Main Office, began exploring the possibility of expanding recruitment for Nordland in Finland. Meanwhile, Finnish officers such as generals Leonard Grandell and Paavo Talvela, who had served in the Imperial German Army as volunteers of the Jäger Movement, (Note: The officer corps of the post-civil war Finnish Army consisted mostly of members of the Jäger Movement, who had traveled to Germany during World War I to receive military training. In Germany, these volunteers formed the 27th Royal Prussian Jäger Battalion, fighting for the Imperial German Army on the Eastern Front of World War I.) began seeking a Finnish volunteer force within the regular German armed forces.

In January 1941, Swedish businessman Ola Vinberg made a visit to Helsinki on a secret assignment with the German Foreign Office and reported to Berger his belief that around 700 Finns would join the SS. Heinrich Himmler, head of the SS, approved expanding recruitment into Finland on 30 January, as did Adolf Hitler on 20 February. On 1 March 1941, Berger presented a request to recruit Finns for the Waffen-SS to the Finnish ambassador to Germany Toivo Mikael Kivimäki, who forwarded the request to Helsinki and to the German Foreign Office. The German Foreign Office sent Wipert von Blücher, the German ambassador in Helsinki, to obtain the Finnish government's consent on 9 March. Negotiations began 11 March and were concluded the following day with the unanimous approval the heads of the civilian Finnish government and Carl Gustaf Emil Mannerheim, Commander in Chief of the Finnish military.

== Recruitment and composition ==
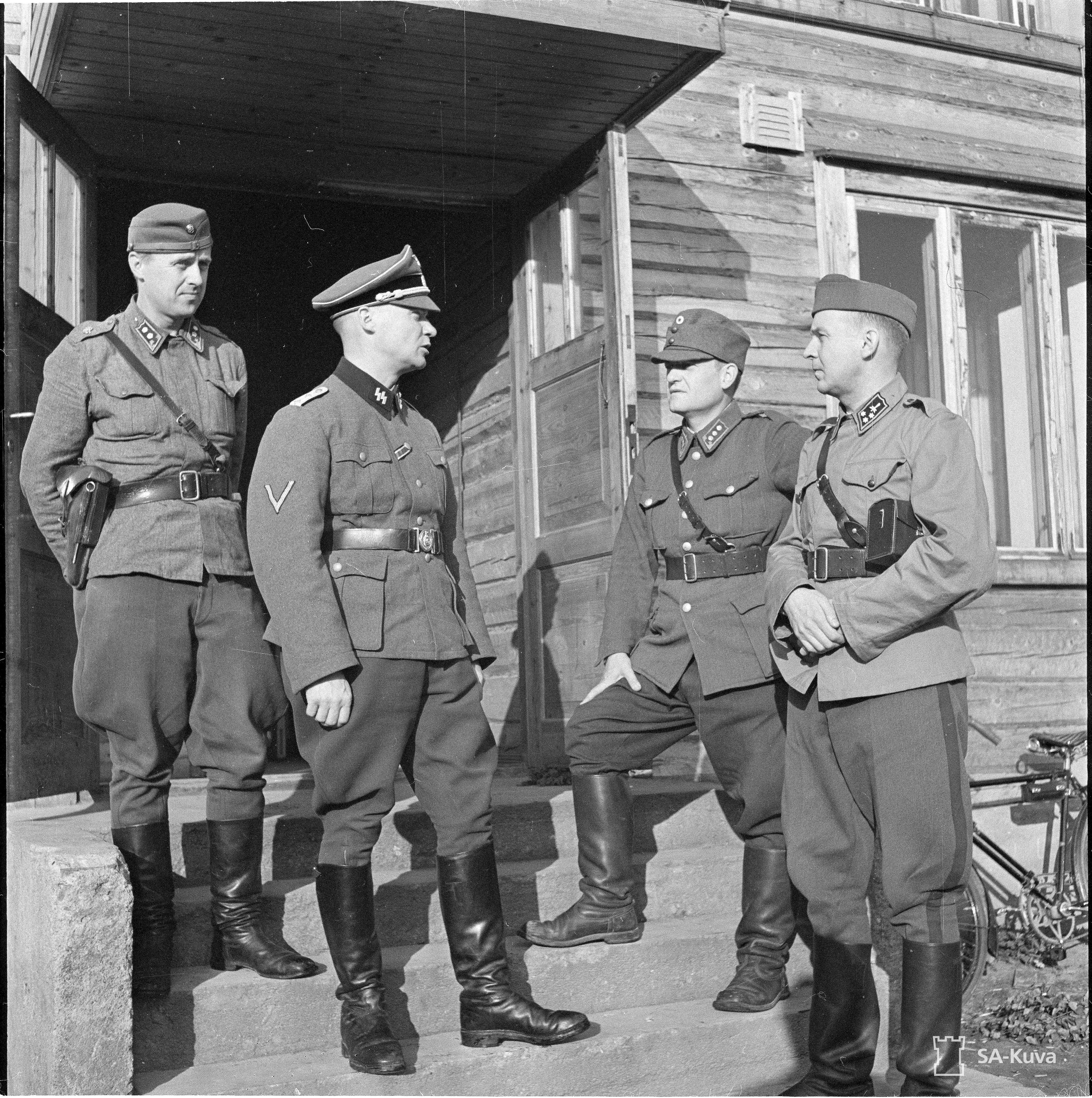
An SS representative speaking with members of the Finnish Army's TK company, August 1941

As the recruitment of volunteers for the Waffen-SS violated Finnish neutrality, recruitment was carried out discreetly and without the official involvement of the Finnish government. To form a committee to manage recruitment in Finland, Paul Dahm, the SS representative for recruitment in Finland, approached Lieutenant Colonel Ragnar Nordström, who declined. In Nordström's stead, Esko Riekki, former chief of the state police, was selected to form the committee. Riekki's committee started organizing recruitment on 25 March and opened an office in Helsinki on 7 April 1941. The office was dubbed the Engineering Agency Ratas (Oy Insinööritoimisto Ratas), ostensibly to recruit workers for the Reichswerke Hermann Göring industrial conglomerate.

Further negotiations delayed the beginning of recruiting to mid-April, as the Finnish government had certain concerns to settle with the SS. Helsinki first wanted Finnish volunteers to serve in the German Army, but eventually consented to the formation of an all-Finnish unit in the Waffen-SS. Helsinki also desired that Finnish volunteers not swear an oath of loyalty to Hitler or be deployed against any country other than the USSR and, in case Finland found itself at war with the USSR alone, that Germany would repatriate its volunteers. Germany accepted these requests on 28 April, in particular changing the oath to be sworn by the Finnish recruits to not mention Hitler. Recruits were to serve in the Waffen-SS until June 1943 and would be sent to Germany for training.

From March 1941, Germany desired the expansion of what became the Finnish Volunteer Battalion into a regiment-strength unit of 2,000 to 2,400 men, which the Finnish government rejected in May 1941. After entering the war on Germany's side, Finland sought the transfer of the Finnish volunteers into the German Army, back to Finland, or to the SS Division Nord alongside Finnish forces. Germany denied these requests.

A second round of recruiting was held from 3 to 27 July 1942 and was limited to 200 men of the Finnish Army under the direction of the pro-German mathematician Rolf Nevanlinna, who replaced Riekki. 239 soldiers were recruited and signed the same agreement as the first wave of volunteers and would be returned to Finland at the same time.

=== Composition ===
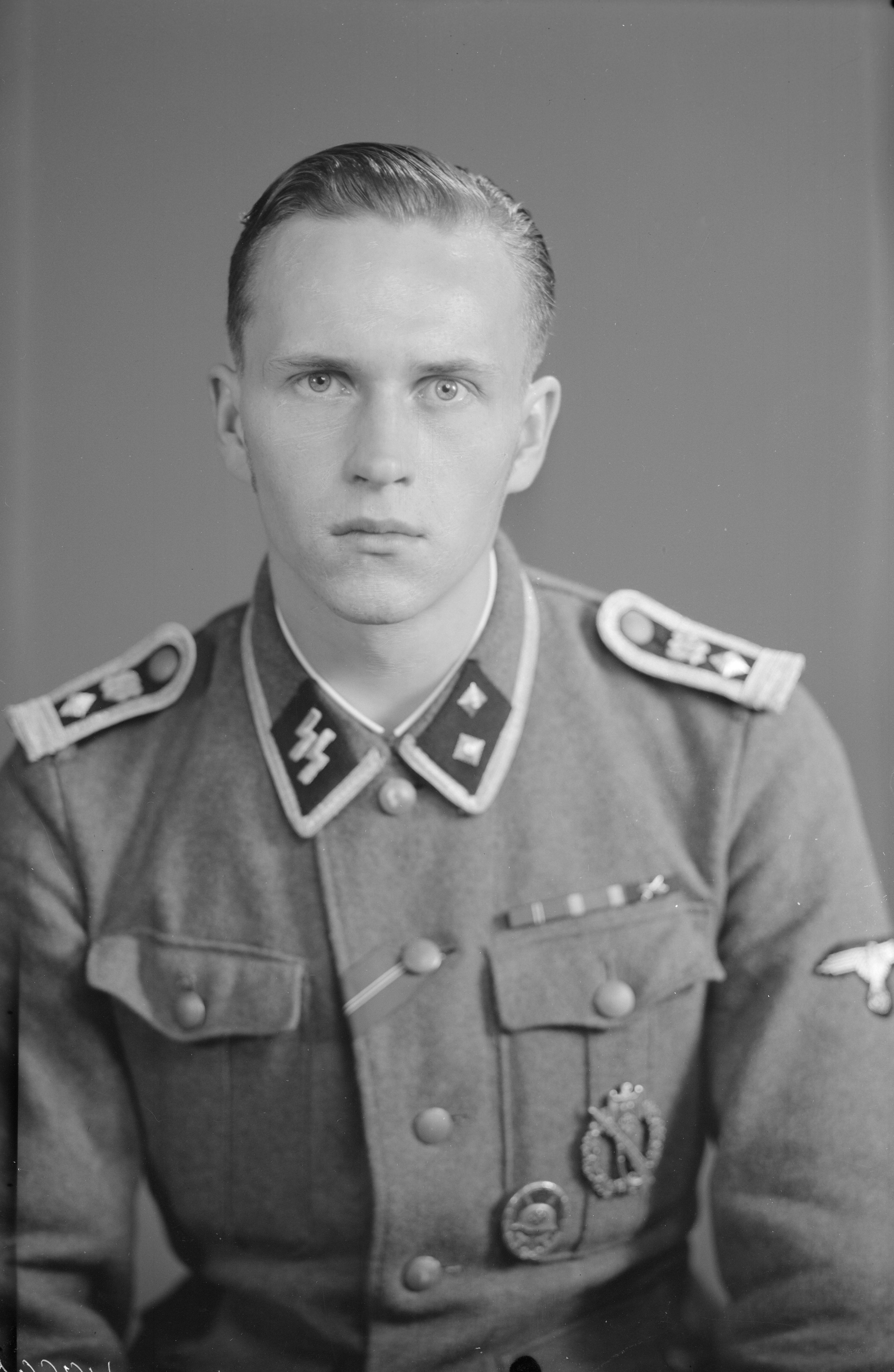
Mikko Korpijaakko served in the 10th company of the SS-Division Wiking's Westland regiment

1,408 Finns were recruited into the Waffen-SS. Although recruitment had initially focused on the Swedish-speaking population of Finland, only about 12% of volunteers were Swedish-speaking. On average, the recruits were 21 years old, and held a collective ideology of Finnish nationalism, revanchism, and a Finnish form of Lutheran revivalism. The recruits' motives included a desire for German training, which implied possible economic advancement immediately through the SS and in the future through the Finnish Army, and pro-German, anti-Russian sentiment. In a report for the National Archives of Finland, Finnish historian Lars Westerlund found that antisemitism was not among the primary motives for the Finnish volunteers.

As the goal of the Finnish government with regard to the volunteer unit was to confirm Finland's alliance with Germany and create a group of Finnish soldiers with German training rather than confirm Finnish allegiance to Germany or to Nazism, the Finnish government supervised recruitment. Helsinki and Riekki, seeking to diminish the influence of Finnish far-right groups in the unit and Finnish politics, recruited in all areas of Finland and carried out background checks on all applicants. Communists and members of far-right groups were excluded, and Riekki broke up attempts by far-right Finnish groups such as the Organisation of National Socialists and Front Soldier League to interfere in recruitment. Nevertheless, about two thirds of recruits came from those groups; according to Finnish historian André Swanström, at least 45.1% of the recruits belonged to fascist groups. Riekki himself was a member of the Finnish-German Society that propagated Nazism, along with another figure central to the recruitment effort Pehr Norrmén. Reliable Finnish officers were also weeded into the volunteer unit to inform Finnish high command of activities within it.

== Formation and training ==
From 6 May to 5 June 1941, 1,197 Finnish recruits traveled to Germany in five ships – four from Turku to Danzig (now Gdańsk) and one from Vaasa to Stettin (now Szczecin) – for training and without passports. Upon arrival in Germany, each group of volunteers spent a few days with the SS garrison at the city of Stralsund. The 429 men aboard the first three ships, known in post-war Finnish historiography as the "division men" as opposed to the "battalion boys" that followed them, were sent to the Heuberg Training Area and the Vienna-Schönbrunn training center for a brief training period. Afterwards they joined various units of the SS Division Wiking in Silesia, ahead of Operation Barbarossa. Unfamiliarity with German tactics and weapons and a language barrier complicated the cohesion of the division men with the rest of SS Division Wiking.

The 768 "battalion boys", meanwhile, were all sent to the Schönbrunn training center where, on 15 June they were formed into the SS-Volunteer Battalion Northeast (motorized) (German: SS-Freiwilligen-Battalion Nordost (mot.)), under the command of German Waffen-SS officer Hans Collani. The battalion returned to Stralsund in July and then in August was moved to the training grounds at Gross Born (now Borne Sulinowo), where on 13 September, it was renamed the Finnish Volunteer Battalion of the Waffen-SS (German: Finnisches Freiwilligen-Bataillon der Waffen-SS). The unit's training was complicated by a lack of Finnish trainers and the battalion's training being reduced in August to 10 October. The battalion's members were sworn in on 15 October, but was two more weeks of training and was not deemed ready for transfer to the Eastern Front until November.

== Eastern Front ==
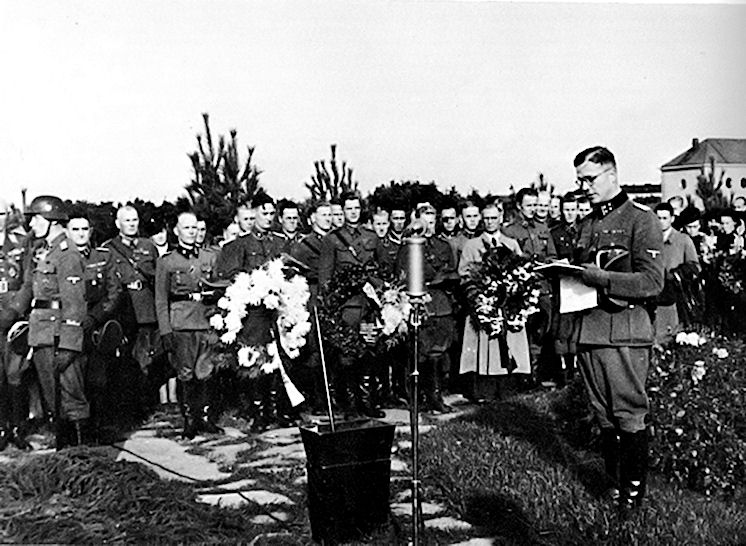
Military chaplain SS-Obersturmbannführer Kalervo Kurkiala gives a memorial speech for fallen troops in Hietaniemi in 1943

The division men, as part of SS Division Wiking, fought against the USSR as part of Army Group South, tasked in Operation Barbarossa with conquering Ukraine. As the division was inexperienced, it was first withheld for a week after the start of Barbarossa and was then assigned as a rearguard unit. In July, elements of it fought against the Red Army near Ternopil and then along the Dnieper River and then in the fighting north of Rostov-on-Don in October. These operations exhausted the division's manpower and essentially reduced it to an infantry unit. After retreating in early November, the division dug in along the Mius River. Soviet and British propaganda claimed that the division – including its Finnish contingent – had been destroyed, prompting the Finnish military attaché in Berlin, Walter Emil Ferdinand Horn, to assuage Finnish concerns about the division.

After a month of delay brought about by heavy railroad traffic, the Volunteer Battalion began transfer to SS Division Wiking on 3–5 December 1941 and joined it along the Mius River on 8 January 1942. The battalion was first assigned to Wiking's Nordland Regiment, though it was assigned its first combat duty with the Westland Regiment on 22 January. Thereafter, the surviving division men were gradually reassigned to the battalion, which was withdrawn from the front for additional training from 14 July to 9 August. The battalion rejoined SS Division Wiking at Maykop on 13 August and subsequently, in September and October, sustained heavy casualties in the attacks on Malgobek, part of the failed German drive on the Grozny oil fields.

A company of replacement Finnish volunteers arrived and were trained briefly in Germany in September 1942 and then joined the SS Division Wiking on 23 November. The company was attached to the battalion on 8 December, but on 20 December the division was detached from the Caucasus front and sent into the ongoing Battle of Stalingrad. This transfer was not affected until January 1943, when the battalion was assigned to Army Group Don and its unsuccessful attempts to relieve the German 6th Army trapped within. From 5 February to 7 February, the battalion retreated across the Don River and continued to fight in Ukraine until it was fully withdrawn from the front on 10 April as the Finns' enlistment was ending.

256 Finnish volunteers were killed in action or died of illness, 686 were wounded, and 14 went missing. According to the State Police Chief in Finland, Finnish officers and NCOs were being treated "like recruits" by their sometimes inexperienced German counterparts, and were angry that their commanders were German. A group of Finns on leave over Christmas even threatened to shoot their German officers. These complaints led to a formal note being filed by Johan Wilhelm Rangell, the Finnish prime minister, which Berger forwarded to Himmler on 9 February 1942.

=== Dissolution ===
The battalion took leave in Ruhpolding, and on 1 June 1943 returned to Hanko, Finland, where a parade was held. On 2 June, the men celebrated at Tampere, and were given one-month's leave. Germany's original plan was for the Finns to continue their service in the SS by renewing their service agreements. However, on 27 June, Mannerheim proposed to Finnish leaders that the SS battalion be dissolved. They accepted the proposal because of changing opinions of Germany. Hitler approved it on 4 July. On 11 July 1943, the battalion celebrated at Hanko and joined the Finnish Defence Forces.

Following the war, many Finnish Waffen-SS volunteers faced changes in attitudes towards Nazi Germany and consequent questions with regards to their participation in the Nazi armed forces. In 1945, communists Eino Pekkala and Hertta Kuusinen introduced the subject of the SS volunteers in the Finnish parliament, starting a campaign against them. From 1946 to 1948, Valpo, the Finnish State Police, arrested and released more than half of the volunteers. Many former SS volunteers were forced to resign from the army and police.

== Finnish SS-Company ==
Finnish SS-Company
- Active: 1944 – May 1945
- Country: Finland
- Allegiance: Nazi Germany
- Branch: Waffen-SS
- Type: Company
- Size: c. 250
- Nickname: Kalevala

Himmler had designated the 41th Waffen SS Division as Grenadier Division Kalevala in preparation for Finnish recruits for when the Red Army occupies Finland. However, this never materialized, and a modest amount of Finns defected, enough to be designated a company. Some of the Waffen SS veterans defected to the Germans after the Moscow Armistice and when open war broke out between Finland and Germany. In addition to those who had served in the SS, some Finnish officers without a background in the SS also joined the new Finnish Battalion that was being formed. The highest ranking defector was Captain Pentti Railio, who was commissioned as a SS-Hauptsturmführer. Most of those who defected either crossed the front lines to the other side, or stowed away on the last German ships that left Finland. SS-officer Lauri Törni and Lieutenant Jalo Korpela were brought to Germany by a German submarine. The Waffen-SS organized officer training for Finns who had defected to Germany or German-occupied Norway at the SS-Junker Schools at Bad Tölz. Sonderkommando Nord organized espionage training at Heringsdorf on the coast of Pomerania, among other places. A detachment of Finnish SS men was formed in Major Otto Skorzeny's regiment Jagdregiment in Neustrelitz. With the help of his assistants, among others SS Obersturmführer Antti Aaltonen and Georg H. Hayen, SS-Hauptsturmführer Jouko Itälä managed to recruit enough defectors, prisoners of war and interned sailors to form a Finnish company. According to docent Lars Westerlund, many Finns were motivated by the belief that Finland was on the brink of destruction: ”If we have to fight, it's best to fight to the end.” The company was disbanded in May 1945.

Helmer Kalas, Ilpo Järvinen, Claes Purjo and Mikko Laaksonen were famous members of the Finnish SS-Company.

== Historiography ==
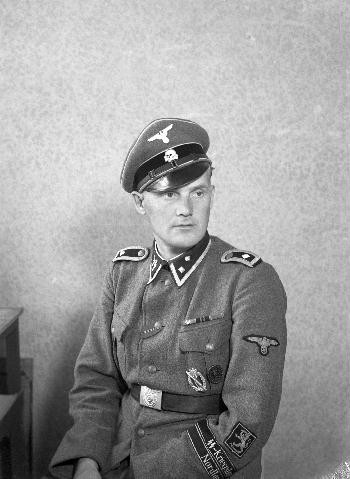
Jukka Tyrkkö, writer and former Finnish Waffen-SS volunteer

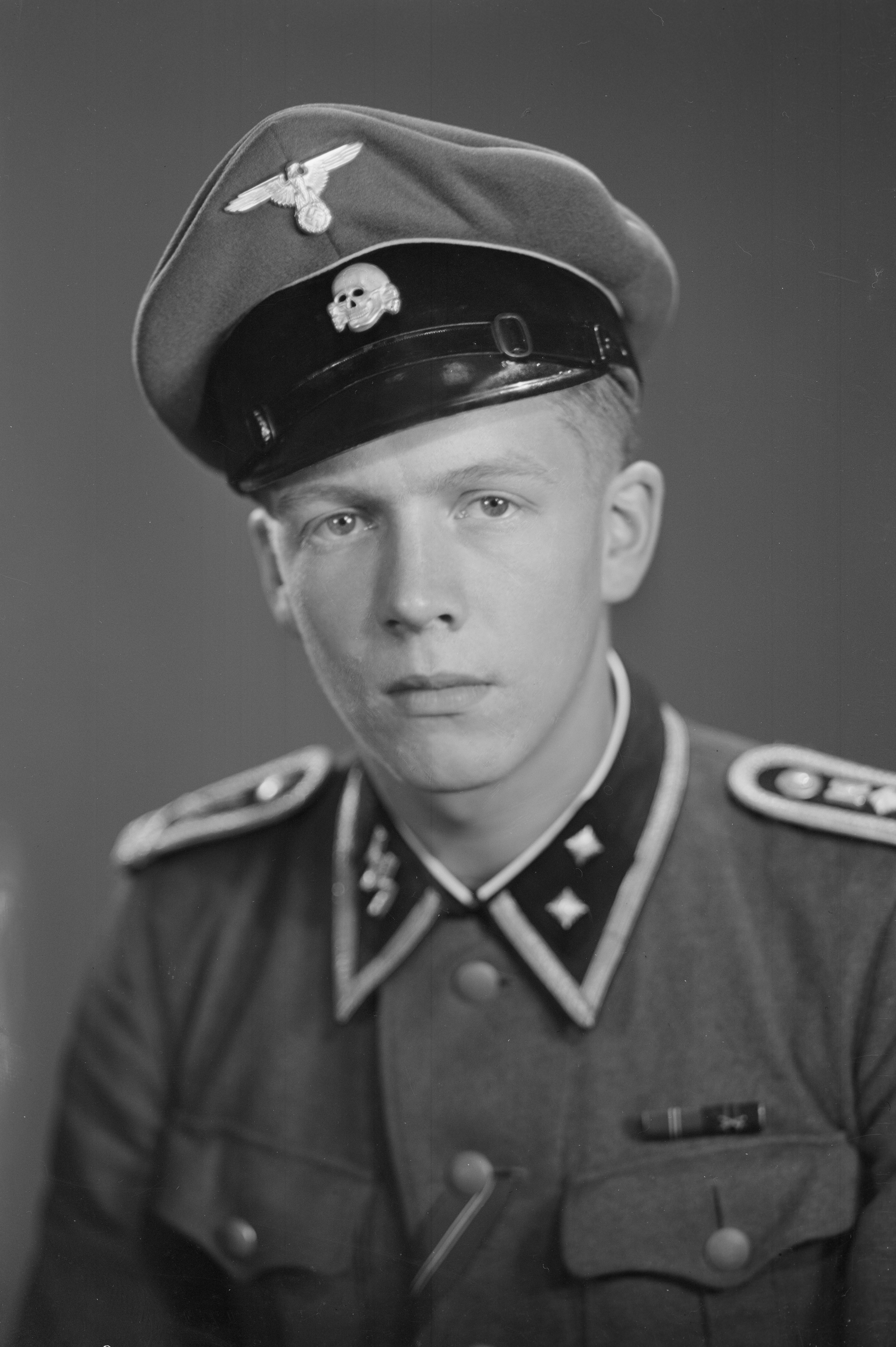
Former Finnish SS soldier Rainer Sormunen in 1943

=== Early works ===
The first book written on the Finnish battalion was Sakari Lappi-Seppälä's memoir in 1945, which was critical of the Wiking Division and reported on German atrocities. In 1957, Niilo Lauttamus published a novel about the experiences of the Finnish Waffen-SS volunteers. In it, he subscribes to the historical argument that the Finnish battalion was apolitical. Unto Parvilahti published his memoir in the mainstream press in 1958, claiming the Finnish volunteers were "not Nazis, they were heroic soldiers who simply defended their fatherland". Many accused Parvilahti of being a Nazi, but the conservative journal Suomalainen Suomi called his claims "laudable, for it is clear that many former SS men were treated unfairly after the war". However, the liberal paper Helsingin Sanomat was more critical, and the reviewer was left disappointed. Ylioppilaslehti, a student magazine, called the memoir "full of nonsense".

=== Panttipataljoona ===
Historian Mauno Jokipii, in his 1968 study of the Finnish volunteers Panttipataljoona: Suomalaisen SS-pataljoonan historia, claimed to apply scholarly methods to their history, but a veterans' organization of former Waffen-SS volunteers commissioned the work. Panttipataljoona is, according to scholar Antero Holmila, "an embodiment of the positivist historical tradition". In his work, Jokipii uses a narrative order to provide a sense of coherence and totality. Holmila Antero criticizes Jokipii, saying his work has a problem in "its distance from the experiences of those who lived through the chaos". Holmila uses the example when Jokipii, describes the aftermath of the death of Westland regiment commander Hilmar Wäckerle and the atrocities committed (burning of a nearby village, Russians and Jews executed without trial for being accused of collaborating with the sniper who killed Weckerle), said that no Finns "were there", which goes against the narrative of Lappi-Seppälä. In its totalizing telling of the story "as it was", Holmila criticizes it as it "assumed its own innocence where the Holocaust was concerned." Holmila says that in doing so, Jokipii "shelters" the audience from the Holocaust.

In Panttipataljoona, Jokipii claimed that, at most, one fifth of the Finnish SS-men would have been right-wing radicals, and that recruiters weeded out extremist applicants. As such, Finland would have purposefully been far from the German goal that two-thirds of the recruits who left to fight for Germany should be "right wing materiel". Based on archival material that surfaced in the 2010s, historians such as Oula Silvennoinen and Marko Tikka, among others, have shown that Jokipii sugar coated the number of right-wing radicals. Both the SS volunteers and the board that recruited them were much more in the hands of nationalist radicals, fascists and national socialists than Jokipii claims. According to Silvennoinen and Tikka, approximately 46 percent of the volunteers, i.e., over twice the number calculated by Jokipii, would have clearly expressed their support for fascist politics.

=== The Jäger and "elite unit" arguments ===
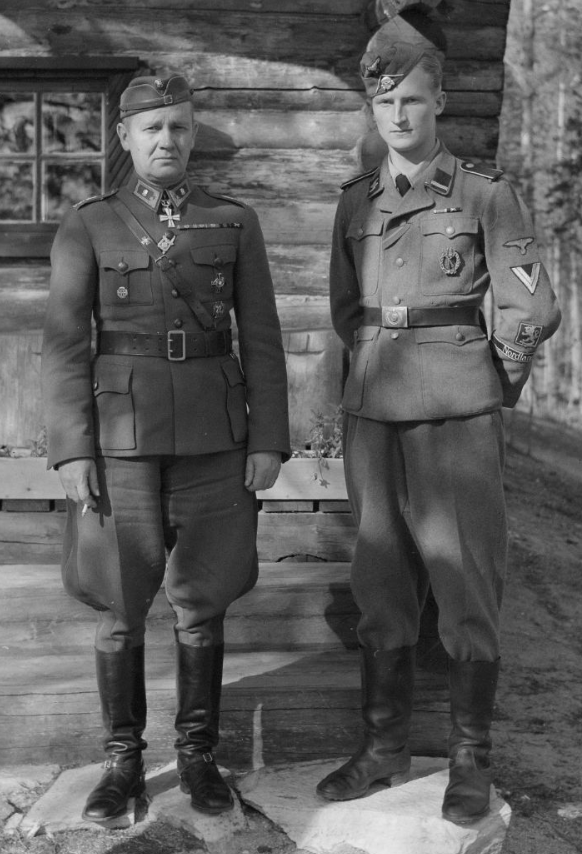
Jäger Major General Erkki Raappana with his son SS-Rottenführer Ermo Raappana

One narrative of the Finnish Waffen-SS was that of rooting the Finnish Waffen-SS in the Jäger Movement. Publications across the political spectrum commonly framed the story in wartime in terms of the "Jäger legacy", not just within right-wing circles, where the story originated. In 1960, Jukka Tyrkkö's memoirs were published with the subtitle "SS volunteers following in the Jägers' footsteps".

The Waffen-SS was known as an elite unit, and this is mentioned in most Finnish literature on the organization. This built up a narrative of the Finnish Waffen-SS volunteers being "elite troops". This narrative surrounds the character of General Felix Steiner, first commander of the SS-Wiking Division, who "recognized and acknowledged the combat skills of his Finnish soldiers". The focus on how elite the soldiers were has taken away from the investigation of the ideologies within the volunteers. The conventional narrative today is that the Waffen-SS soldiers were "apolitical". Many loyalist authors focus on this narrative.

=== Participation in atrocities ===
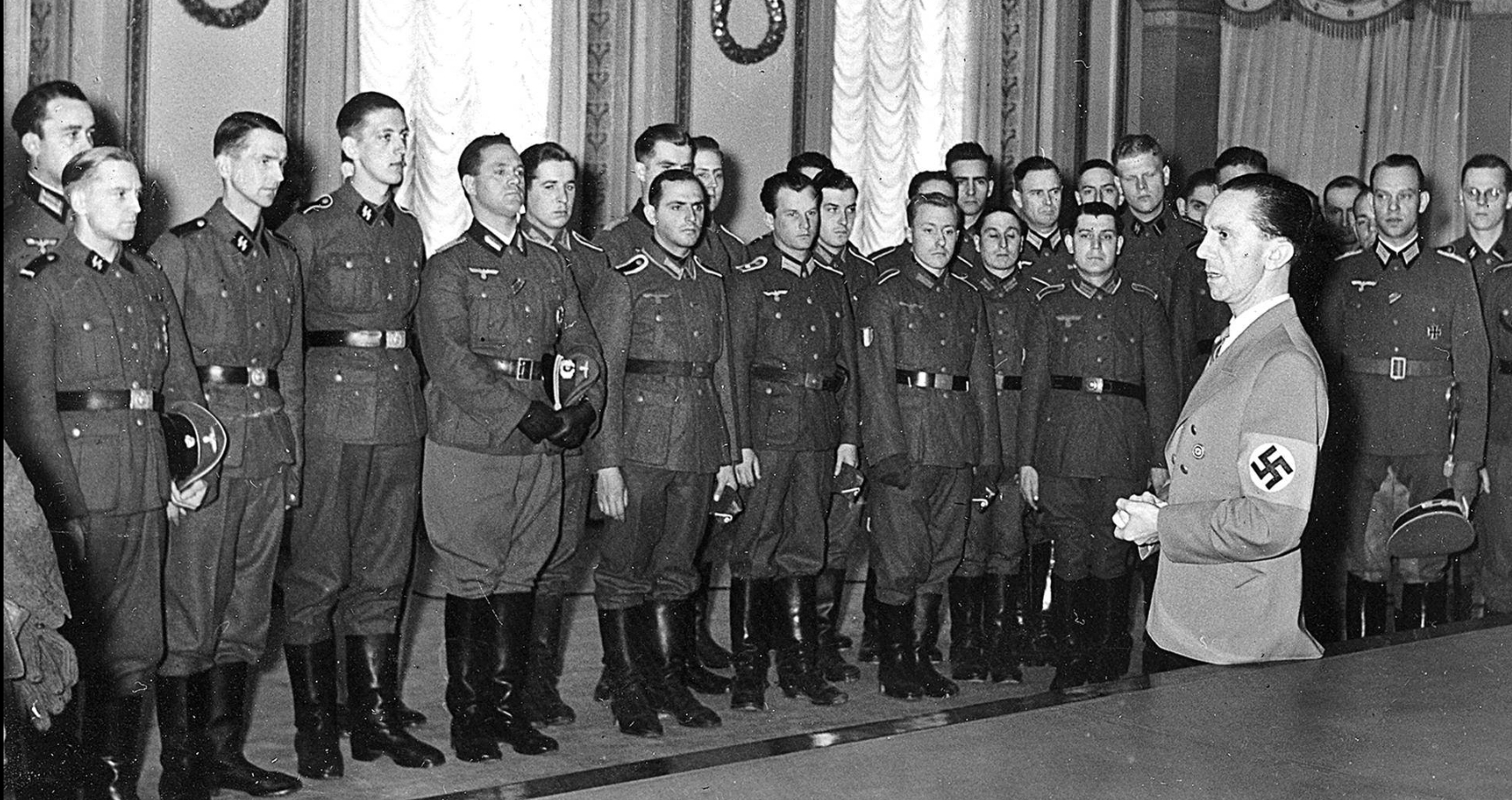
Finnish Waffen SS men meeting Goebbels in 1942.

Until at least 2013, much of the Finnish discussion of the early months of the war had been positive, with only some references to the atrocities. Within Finnish historiography, the absence of "things which cannot be written here" – atrocities and the realities of war hinted at but not explicitly stated – supports the ideas that these "things" never happened and that the Finns were not involved in atrocities. The Finnish public largely shunned the idea that Finnish volunteers would have taken part in atrocities.

The topic saw renewed public attention in 2017, following the publication of Andre Swanström's article on the pastors of the Finnish SS-volunteers. The article cites several excerpts from diaries of Finnish SS-pastors and claims that the Finns were at the very least aware of, and had witnessed, atrocities and war crimes. Swanström followed the article with a 2018 book Hakaristin Ritarit (Knights of the Swastika), which the newspaper Helsingin Sanomat described using the title (transl.) "The flawless image of 'normal Finnish boys' in the SS-troops is shattered in the most important military historical work of the year." Swanström's 2017 article prompted the Simon Wiesenthal Center to request from Finnish president Sauli Niinistö an inquiry into the possible participation of the Waffen-SS volunteers in the Holocaust. In response to the request, Finnish authorities announced a committee of inquiry into the activities of the battalion. The committee's work, including that by researchers from the National Archives of Finland, concluded at the end of 2018. The resulting 2019 publication drew significant media coverage, including demands for "correction" by close relatives of the SS-volunteers, which the National Archive of Finland refused. According to the report, the Finnish soldiers were well aware of the atrocities being committed, and sometimes had traumatic responses to them, which they tried to remedy through heavy drinking. The report's author, Lars Westerlund, concludes that "at least some of the cases show that Finnish volunteers did participate in carrying out atrocities against Jews and civilians", including specifically Olavi Karpalo and Parvilahti. According to Swanström, his publication and that of Westerlund resulted in a "post-myth research situation [which] allows for the history of the Finnish SS-men to be inspected more realistically and from more points of view". Commentators such as the president of the SS heritage association noted that the reports were not absolutely definite in their statements that the Finns themselves committed atrocities. Historian Antero Holmila interprets these types of views as stemming from the public's "need to view war as a black-and-white either-or play", where the lack of a "smoking gun" is seen as a failure by the historian, and that the topic remains a "pain point in Finnish history culture".

=== International perspectives ===
Many international perspectives take into consideration the fact that the Finnish volunteers were likely involved in atrocities. According to historian Bernd Boll, the Wiking Division, while marching to Złoczów, went "hunting for Jews" and shot "everything and anybody that looked even the slightest bit suspicious". Historian Peter Longerich wrote: "In Zloczow at the beginning of July, under the very eyes of Sonderkommando 4b and tolerated by the city commandant, Ukrainian activists had organized a massacre of the Jewish population in which members of the SS Viking Division took part on a huge scale." Sakari Lappi-Seppälä describes how Parvilahti, a "National Socialist", destroyed a chapel in Złoczów. However, there is no concrete evidence regarding the involvement of Finnish soldiers in atrocities, so it is commonly assumed, according to Parvilahti's standard narrative, that the troops saw "unpleasant excesses" of German warfare but the war was very much conventional.

== Legacy ==
The Nordic Resistance Movement along with other nationalist organizations organizes an annual torch march demonstration in Helsinki in memory of the Finnish SS Battalion on the Finnish independence day, which ends at the Hietaniemi cemetery where members visit the tomb of Carl Gustaf Emil Mannerheim and the monument to the Finnish SS Battalion. The event has been protested by antifascists, which has led to counterdemonstrators being violently assaulted by the NRM members who act as security. The demonstration attracts close to 3000 participants according to the estimates of the police and hundreds of officers patrol Helsinki to prevent violent clashes. The march has been attended and promoted by the Finns Party, and condemned by left-wing parties, for example Green League MP Iiris Suomela characterized it as "obviously neo-Nazi" and expressed their disappointment in it being attended by such a large number of people.

In between 2019–2022, Finns party MP and later Minister of Economic Affairs Vilhelm Junnila made four budgetary motions in order to support Veljesapu-Perinneyhdistys, a Finnish organization that cherishes the heritage of the Finnish volunteers in the Waffen-SS. Junnila wrote in his motion, that the support would be "for the promotion of balanced historical research". According to Der Spiegel, three Finns party ministers supported a motion to provide funding for SS veterans association for a "counter-study" in response to accusations of Finnish SS men having participated in the Holocaust.

The last living Finnish Waffen-SS veteran, Sakari Lahtinen, died in a nursing home in Haapamäki on October 12, 2022. He was 99 years old.

== See also ==
- 664th Eastern Battalion, Finnish unit of Wehrmacht
