= Jukka Tyrkkö =

Finnish war correspondent (1912–1979)

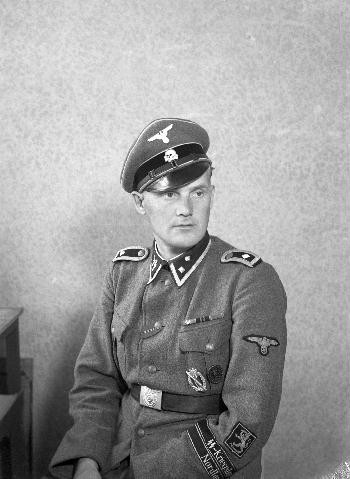
War correspondent Tyrkkö in uniform, 1943

Jukka Pellervo Tyrkkö (2 April 1912 – 16 October 1979) was a Finnish war writer.

== Life ==
In 1933, at the age of 21, Jukka Tyrkkö began publishing the first newspaper in his birth town of Ylöjärvi, entitled Ylöjärvi (now Ylöjärven Uutiset). Tyrkkö served in the Finnish Volunteer Battalion of the Waffen-SS as a war correspondent. Patriotic People's Movement and Blue-and-Blacks activist Tyrkkö sought to build a connection between the Jäger Movement and the SS Battalion in his writings. For example, his writings in the newspapers Aamulehti, Rintamamies, Suomi-Saksa, Hakkapeliitta and Ajan Suunta were openly anti-Bolshevist and national-socialist. His reports and articles built an image of the Greater Finland and Finland's central position in Germany-led new Europe. He later recounted his experiences in his book Suomalaisia suursodassa (English: Finns in the Great War). From 1943 to 1944, he was also the secretary of the Finnish organization SS-Aseveljet (the SS Brothers in Arms Association), working as a propagandist.

== Works ==
- Myllärin tytär (My daughter's daughter) (play, 1949)
- Suomalaisia suursodassa. SS-vapaaehtoisten vaiheita jääkäreiden jäljillä 1941–43 (Finns in the Great War) (1960)
- Kultakello (Gold watches) (novel, 1970)
- Sallan savotta 1941 (1971)
- Pajari rintamakenraalina: Aaro Olavi Pajari (1897–1949) sotilaana, esimiehenä ja ihmisenä (Pajari as Front Colonel: Aaro Olavi Pajari (1897–1949) as a Soldier, Head and Man) (1974)
- Lauri Törnin tarina: vapaustaistelijan vaiheita Viipurista Vietnamiin (Lauri Törni's Story: A Liberty Fighter from Vyborg to Vietnam) (1975)
