= Helmer Kalas =

Finnish soldier, memoirist and spy (1921-1976)

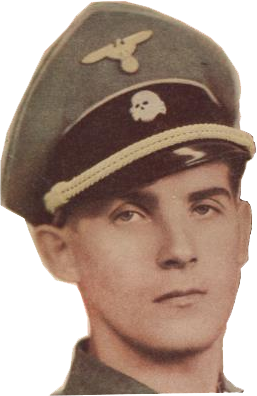

Kaarlo Helmer Kalas (former surname Kilkki; 1 July 1921 – 1976) was a Finnish soldier, memoirist and spy.

== Early life and World War II ==
Kalas' parents were police constable August Evald Kilkki and Martta Huopalainen. Kalas graduated from high school in 1940 (transferred to the VII grade from Mikkeli Lyceum ). He participated in the Winter War as a corporal and in the Continuation War as a second lieutenant after attending cadet school during the inter-peace period. His last military rank was lieutenant. During the Lapland War, in late October 1944, Kalas defected from his unit JR 57 located near Tornio through Sweden to the German side in Norway. After spending a couple of months in a German prison camp, he volunteered to join the SS forces on the condition that he would not have to fight against Finland or the Western powers, and received the rank of SS-Obersturmführer. From March 1945, he was on the German Eastern Front as the head of a tank company and later as a battalion commander. Right at the end of the war, his company broke through the blockade of the Red Army to the side of the Western Allies and surrendered to the British forces on May 13.

== Post-War ==
Kalas was a British prisoner of war in Italy for 13 months, but escaped from the POW camp with the help of a Catholic priest. He lived in Italy for eight years under a false name and Lithuanian identity papers, working as a businessman. In 1948, he married the Italian Gina Fuser.

Kalas returned to Finland in June 1954 and reported to the authorities. In 1955, he published a memoir, Kymmenen vuotta seikkailujen tiellä (Ten Years on the Road of Adventures), in which he recounted his service in the German army and, among other things, his visit to the Dachau concentration camp. The work was ghostwritten by thriller writer Aarne Haapakoski. The book also appeared as a follow-up story in Kuvaposti.

In 1955, the Supreme Court sentenced Kalas to four years and two months in the penitentiary for going over to the enemy's side during the war, and the Helsinki Court of Appeals also sentenced Kalas to 18 months in the penitentiary for forging bills, which were combined into a five-year penitentiary sentence. However, Kalas fled to France, from where he moved in 1957 to West Germany and later to Gothenburg, Sweden. Around this time, Kalas joined the CIA to spy against the Soviet Union. In 1958, he recruited the Estonian emigrant Heinrich Mark as a spy for the CIA, who obtained information about Soviet Estonia. Kalas' wife finally turned him in by delivering a briefcase containing secret documents to the Swedish police. Kalas and Mark were imprisoned in January 1961. In March of the same year, Kalas was sentenced to ten months of forced labor, compensation of 5,000 kroner to the state and deportation from Sweden for espionage. Mark was sentenced to seven months of forced labor. In 1963, Kalas claimed to a Danish newspaper that the Swedish authorities had leaked classified trial documents to Finland. At that time, he was still wanted in Finland for treason. Heinrich Mark later became the Prime Minister and President of the Estonian government-in-exile.

Kalas was eventually found dead in a hotel in Malmö, Sweden.

== Works ==
- Kymmenen vuotta seikkailujen tiellä
