= Lake Yaglyayarvi =

Lake in Karelia, Russia

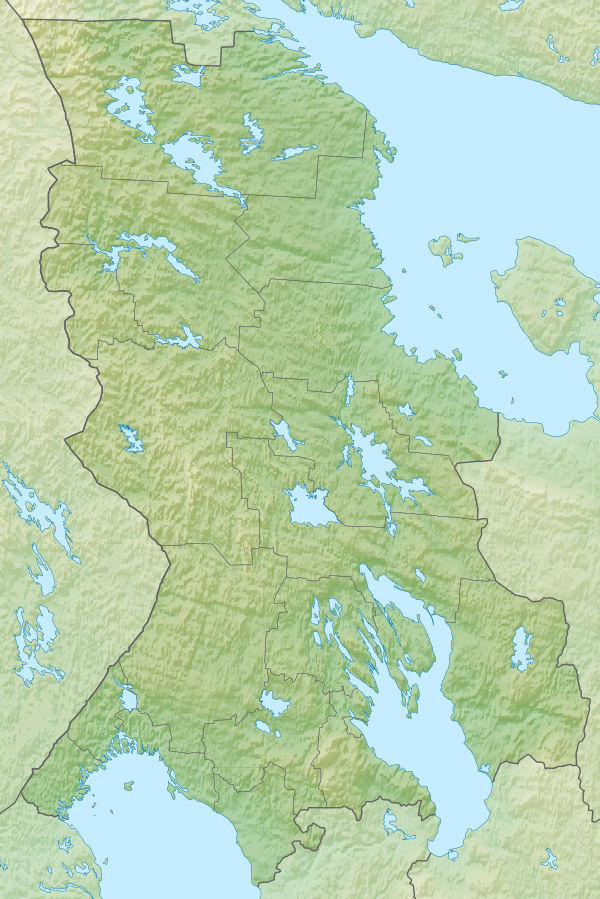
- Location within Karelia
- Location: Republic of Karelia
- Coordinates: 62°20′N 31°49′E
- Basin countries: Russia

Lake Yaglyayarvi (Russian: Ягляярви; Finnish: Ägläjärvi) is a multibranching lake in the Republic of Karelia, in the Ladoga Karelia. It is a part of the Shuya drainage basin. The lake flows through to the Lake Salonyarvi.

Before the Winter War, the lake was located on the territory of the Korpiselkä municipality of Finland. During the war the area was a scene of the battle of Tolvajärvi.
