= Mikko Laaksonen =

Finnish jurist, trade union leader and politician (1927–2006)

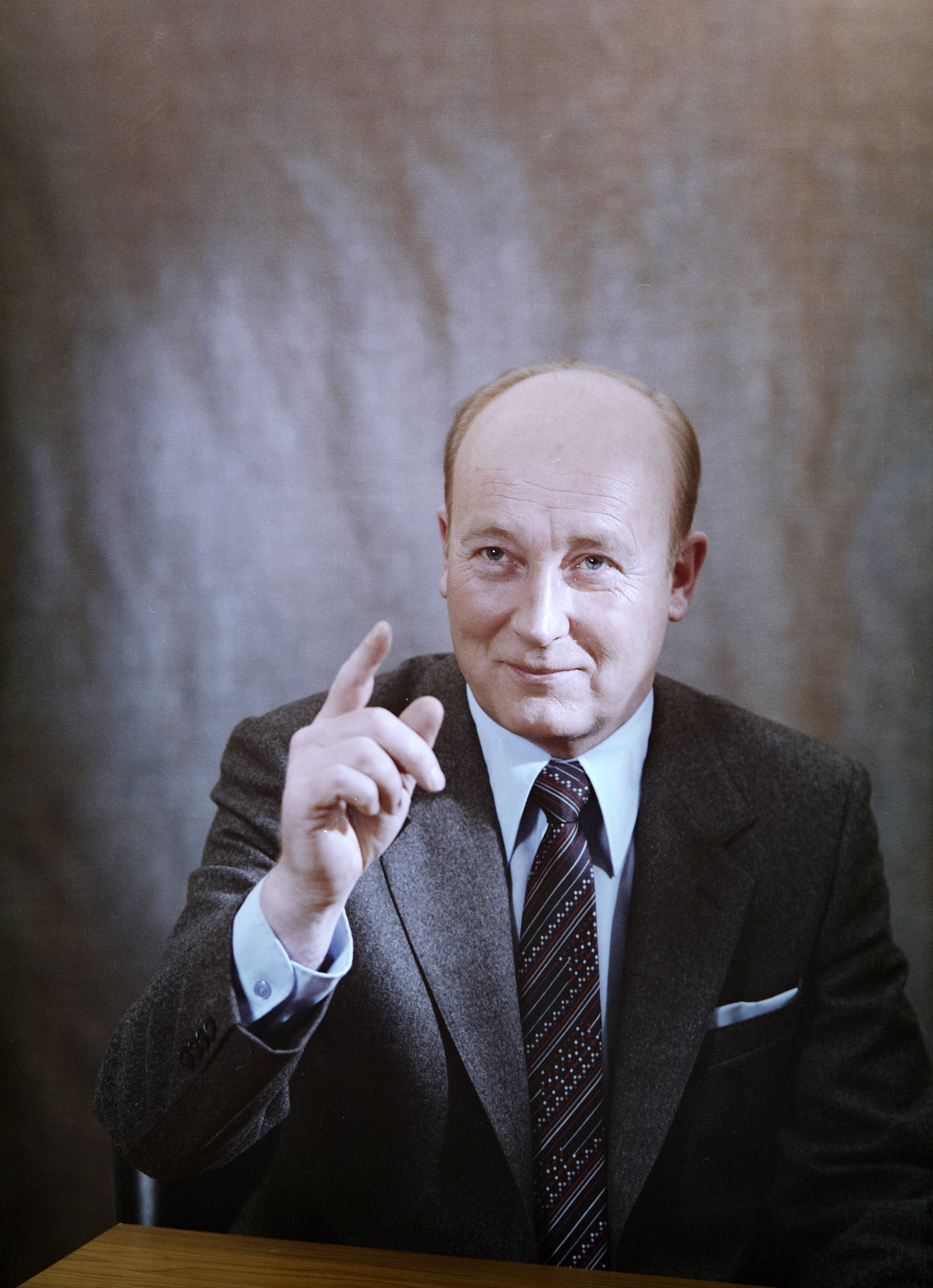
Mikko Laaksonen in 1980

Mikko Olavi Laaksonen (27 August 1927 – 11 January 2006) was a Finnish jurist, trade union leader and politician, born in Helsinki. He was a member of the Parliament of Finland from 1966 to 1971, representing the Social Democratic Party of Finland (SDP). He served as Minister of Justice and Deputy Minister of the Interior from 26 March to 30 September 1971. At the age of 17, in 1944, Laaksonen enlisted in the Finnish SS-Company and served in the German military from 1944 to 1945, at a time when Germany and Finland were at war with each other (the Lapland War). Laaksonen applied to the membership of Veljesapu, SS veterans organization, but was not accepted. Veljesapu admitted members of the Finnish SS Company inconsistently, as it was mainly for the SS Battalion veterans.

Laaksonen retired in 1981, and he lived rest of his life in Spain. He died in Fuengirola, Spain.
