= Bolshoy Tyuters =

Russian island in Baltic Sea

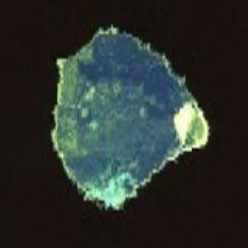
- Interactive map of Bolshoy Tyuters

Geography
- Location: Gulf of Finland
- Coordinates: 59°51′N 27°12′E
- Area: 8.3 km^{2} (3.2 sq mi)

Administration
- Russia
- Leningrad Oblast

Demographics
- Population: 1

Bolshoi Tyuters (Russian: Большой Тютерс; Finnish: Tytärsaari; Estonian: Suur Tütarsaar; Swedish: Tyterskär) is an island in the Gulf of Finland of the Baltic Sea, located 75 km (47 mi) away from the coast of Finland, to the south-east from Hogland. The island is a part of the Leningrad Oblast, Russia. The area is approximately 8.3 km^{2} (3.2 sq mi). There are no permanent inhabitants, save for a lighthouse keeper.

== History ==
The island was populated by Finns from the 16th century to 1939. After the Soviet Union attacked Finland in the Winter War, the island, along with other Finnish islands in the Gulf of Finland and communities in Finnish Karelia, was ceded to the Soviet Union under the Moscow Peace Treaty of 1940. Islanders were among the Finnish evacuees, and after World War II they were not permitted to return to their homes.

Before the war, the island was a lively Finnish fishing and trading community, with a population of 436 in 1939. Many cargo and fishing ships were registered to the island. It had a wooden church built in 1772, a Finnish graveyard, a school, a lighthouse built in 1904, a Finnish Coast Guard station and a weather forecast station. Tourism was a growing business in 1920–39. The name Tytärsaari means "Daughter Island" in Finnish.

Bolshoi Tyuters is sometimes referred to as the "mined island" because its World War II minefields have not been cleared. Thousands of rusting pieces of German equipment and weaponry, including artillery and ammunition, are scattered on the island.
