= Battle of Hogland (1713) =

Naval battle between Sweden and Russia in 1713

- Part of the Great Northern War
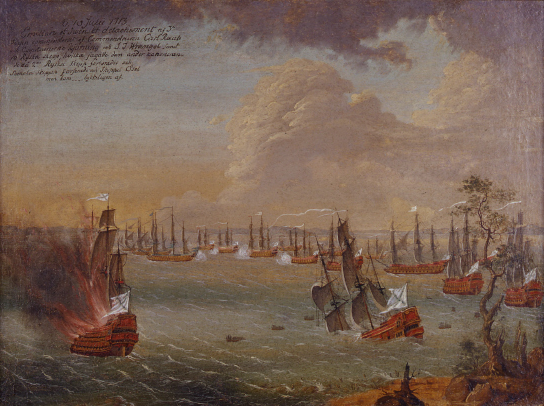
- Battle of Hogland, 1713
Date	10–11 July 1713 (O.S.); 21–22 July 1713 (N.S.)
Location	Gulf of Finland, 50 km south of Porvoo 59.986°N 25.599°E
Result	Inconclusive

Belligerents
Swedish Navy	Imperial Russian Navy

Commanders and leaders
Carl Raab	Cornelius Cruys

Strength
3 ships of the line	6 ships of the line 5 frigates 2 brigs

Casualties and losses
Minor crew losses	1 ship of the line

The Battle of Hogland was a naval battle between Sweden and Russia which took place on 21–22 July 1713 (N.S.; 10–11 July 1713 O.S.) near the Kalbådagrund shoal in the Gulf of Finland, 50 km (31 mi) south of Porvoo, Sweden (present-day Finland). It was an indecisive engagement, part of the Great Northern War.

== Ships involved ==
=== Sweden ===
- Verden 54 guns
- Osel 50 guns
- Estland 48 guns

=== Russia ===
- Poltava 54 guns
- Pernov 50 guns
- Randolf 50 guns
- Riga 50 guns
- Sv. Antonii 50 guns
- Vyborg 50 guns
- Esperans 40 guns
- Sv. Pavel 32 guns
- Sv. Petr 32 guns
- Samson 32 guns
- Shtandart 28 guns
- 2 brigs

== Prelude ==
A small Swedish squadron led by Commander Carl Raab consisting of three ships of the line encountered on 21 July 1713 (N.S.) a much larger Russian squadron near Hogland who gave chase to the Swedes withdrawing towards west.

== Battle ==
Early on the 22 July (N.S.), faster Russian ships had gained the Swedish squadron and reached firing distance. Intense fighting took place near Kalbådagrund and Yttre Hällkallan shallows. During the fight, Raab's flagship Ösel run aground but could swiftly detach itself and rejoin the fight. Three Russian ships following also run aground, one of them so badly that it could not be pulled free and had to be torched. Swedish ships had suffered only superficial damage and withdrew to Helsinki while the Russian squadron lost a 50-gun ship of the line Viborg.

== Bibliography ==
- Mattila, Tapani (1983). Meri maamme turvana [Sea safeguarding our country] (in Finnish). Jyväskylä: K. J. Gummerus Osakeyhtiö. ISBN 951-99487-0-8.
