= Olavi Karpalo =

Finnish SS volunteer (1916–1988)

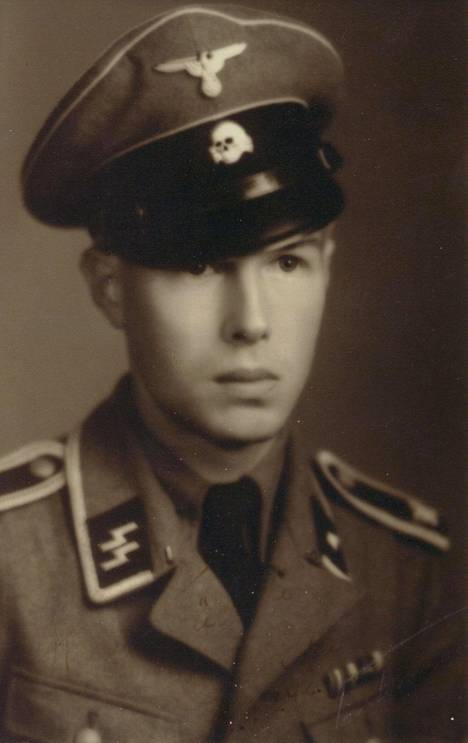
Olavi Karpalo as a Finnish volunteer in the Waffen-SS during World War II, with the rank of SS-Scharführer

Olavus (Olavi) Gustavus Adolphus Karpalo (21 October 1916 Helsinki – 1988 Venezuela) was a Finnish SS volunteer. By civilian profession, he was a set designer.

At the age of 20, Karpalo participated as a volunteer in the Spanish Civil War in 1937 in Franco's Falangist forces, he had informed his guardians that he was traveling to Germany for the Hitler Youth trip. Karpalo later published a book about his war experiences, Sisulla sotaan : falangistin kokemuksia Espanjasta (WSOY 1940).

Karpalo was in the Winter War with the Squadron 39. He joined the Finnish SS volunteers in 1941 and was one of those 400 volunteers in the so-called Men of the Division who were sent right at the end of June 1941 to the Eastern front with the SS Division Wiking because they already had combat experience. In a letter he wrote to the liaison officer of the SS forces, military pastor Ensio Pihkala on July 24, 1941, Karpalo also mentioned that he had participated in the executions of Jews with five other Finns from his peer company in Tarashcha. The letter came to light in the fall of 2017 when André Swanström, docent of church history at Åbo Akademi University, published previously classified documents. After receiving the letter, Pihkala went to meet the men in their unit and Karpalo later thanked him for the visit. Swanström studied the Finnish volunteers of the support company and according to him, they were right-wing radicals, some had proclaimed that they were National Socialists.

Karpalo was later transferred to another SS group, serving with them until May 1942. After returning to Finland, he served with Flight Squadron 32 until the end of the Continuation War. After the war, he moved to Venezuela after first receiving a certificate for himself from a bribed official in the passport office in Rauma, due to post-war travel restrictions imposed on former SS men by Finland's State Police. Karpalo spent the rest of his life in Venezuela, where he also died.
