= Battle of Tolvajärvi =

Battle in Winter War between Finland and Soviet Union

- Part of Winter War
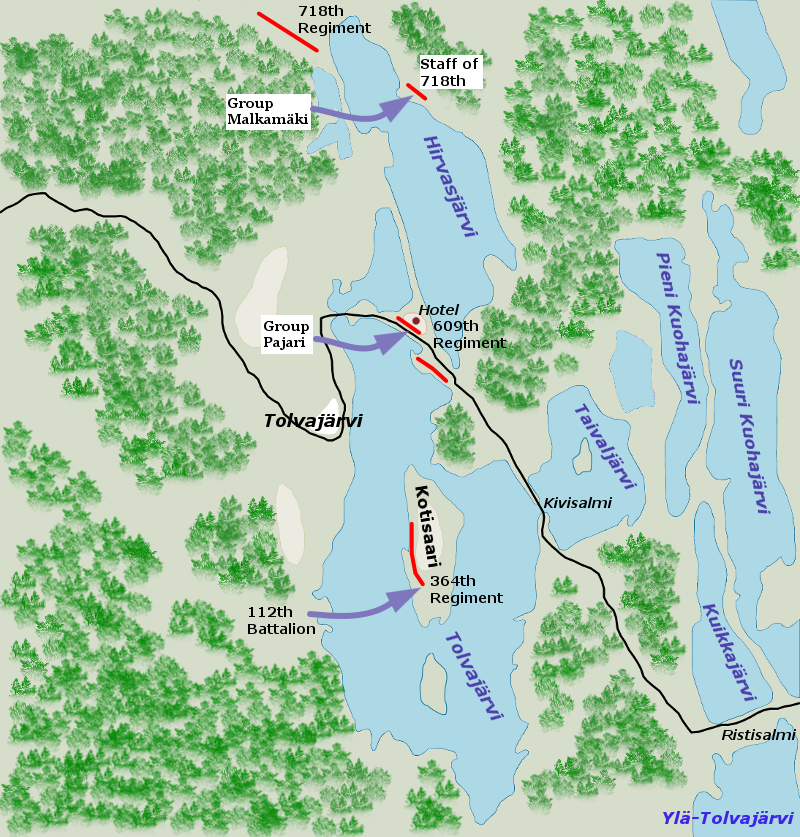
- Plan of the Finnish attack
Date	12–23 December 1939 (1 week and 4 days)
Location	Tolvajärvi and Ägläjärvi, north of Lake Ladoga, Finland (today Republic of Karelia, Russia) 62°17′17″N 31°29′18″E
Result	Finnish victory

Belligerents
Finland	Soviet Union

Commanders and leaders
(Finland) Paavo Talvela (Finland) Aaro Pajari	(Soviet Union) Nikolai Belyaev

Units involved
Group Talvela	16th Rifle Division

Strength
4,000 men	20,000 men

Casualties and losses
630 killed 1,320 wounded	4,000–5,000 killed 5,000+ wounded 20 tanks destroyed 39 armoured vehicles destroyed 30 guns destroyed
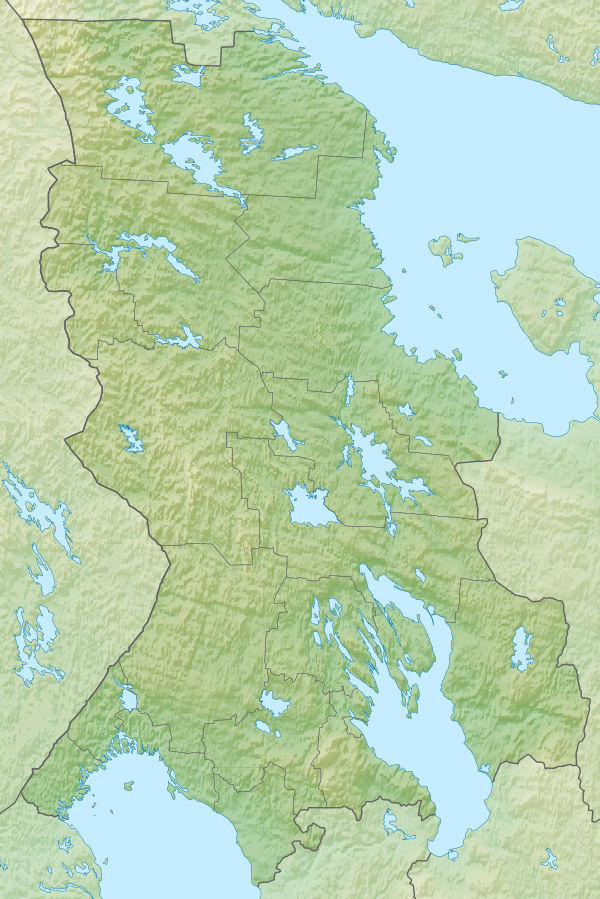
- Location within Karelia Battle of Tolvajärvi (Finland)

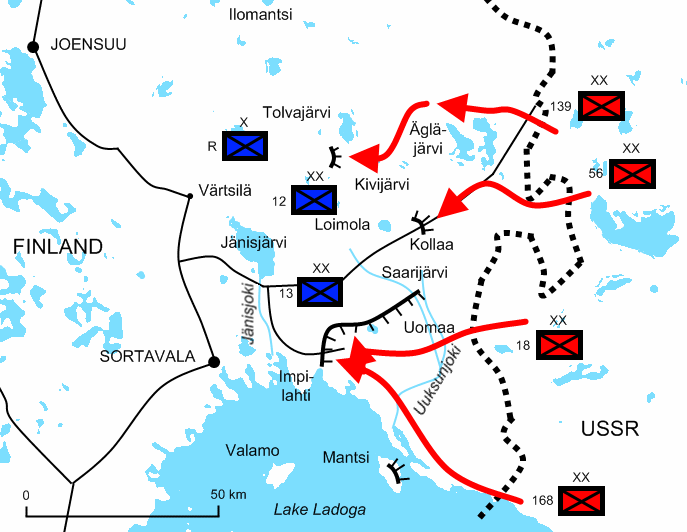
Soviet attacks in Ladoga Karelia

The Battle of Tolvajärvi ([ˈtol.ʋɑˌjær.ʋi]; Finnish: Tolvajärven–Ägläjärven taistelu, Russian: Битва при Толваярви) began on 12 December 1939 and continued for about a week and a half, between Finland and the Soviet Union. It was the first large offensive victory for the Finns in the Winter War.

The battle took place on the territory of so-called Ladoga Karelia (Finnish: Laatokan Karjala) which today is part of the Republic of Karelia in Russia.

== Background ==
On 2 December, the Red Army captured Suojärvi, threatening the railroad to the Karelian Isthmus and the rear of the Mannerheim Line. On 6 December, the IV Army Corps was reorganized by Mannerheim into a Group commanded by Paavo Talvela. Aaro Pajari was immediately ordered by Talvela to defend the western shore of Lake Tolvajärvi, while Per Ole Ekholm was ordered to continue the defense of Ilomantsi. On 10 December, Talvela issued counteroffensive orders to both Pajari and Ekholm for the next day.

On 11 December, Talvela reorganized the planned attack over frozen lakes Hirvasjärvi and Tolvajärvi, following the Battle of Varolampi Pond on the night of 10–11 December. On 12 December, a reinforced battalion under J.A. Malkamäki, would attack of northern Lake Hirvasjärvi and the rear of northeast Kotisaari Island. Pajari would then advance from the western shore of Lake Tolvajäri across Hevossalmi Strait.

== Composition ==
- Finnish side (4,000):
  - Talvela Group of the 4th Corps (16th Infantry Regiment)
  - Räsänen detachment (4 separate battalions and one artillery battalion of the 6th Artillery Regiment)

The Finnish side consisted of 7 infantry battalions and 30 pieces of artillery.

The Finnish 16th Infantry Regiment was composed of workers out of Tampere city and headed by the chief of police of Tampere.

- Soviet side (20,000):
  - 139th Rifle Division of the 8th Army (718th, 609th, 364th Rifle regiments)

The Soviet side consisted of 9 infantry battalions, 60 artillery pieces, one scout battalion, one signal battalion, one sapper battalion, 30 tanks, and 376 planes.

== Battle ==
Malkamäki's attack was delayed until daylight when it encountered two battalions of the Soviet 718th Regiment preparing to make their own attack on the Finnish flank. The opposing attacks cancelled each other. The Finnish Third Company retreated back to the Tolvajärvi-Kokkari road, while the Second Company crossed the lake and turned south before stalling near the Hirvasvaara ridge. By noon, Malkamäki ordered a retreat around the northern end of the lake. However, parts of the Second Company remained in the Hirvasaara area in support of Pajari's flank. Simultaneously, the Finnish First and Second Companies of ErP 112 attacked the southern end of Kotisaari Island, but were forced to retreat to the south by early afternoon.

Pajari's attack across the Tolvajärvi peninsula was also delayed until 9:15, meeting resistance 200 yards west of the tourist hotel. Three Soviet tanks were disabled, and Pajari committed his reserves in an attack on the hill containing the hotel, and Hirvasharju. Becoming demoralized by the renewed attacks, the Soviets began to retreat. ErP 112 renewed its attack on Kotisaari Island and threatened the Soviet supply road at Kivisalmi. The Soviet commander Belyaev then ordered the withdrawal of his 139th Division as far as Ristisalmi.

On 14 December, the Finns renewed their counteroffensive, now encountering the Soviet 75th Division, reserves sent in to replace the 139th. Yet, by the end of the day the Finnish troops had secured the Ristisalmi Strait and the Soviets continued their retreat towards Metsänvaara. On the 17th, Talvela committed all of his reserves to Pajari. On 18 December, the battle had reached Ägläjärvi, which fell on 22 December. On 23 December, the Finnish troops reached the Aittojoki River.

== Aftermath ==
Mannerheim called a halt to the advance along the Aittojoki River, and ordered defensive positions prepared. The Red Army's losses along the Tolvajärvi-Aittojoki road included 4,000 dead, 580 prisoners, 59 tanks, and 220 machine guns. Yet, by this time the Finnish losses were also accumulating, especially after the frontal attacks at Tolvajärvi and Ägläjärvi. According to Allen Chew, for the Finns, "Proportionally, these were the heaviest losses of the entire war," with 630 killed and 1,320 wounded. Yet despite the Finnish losses associated with their first offensive victory, according to Chew, "It would be difficult to exaggerate the significance of the Finnish victory," eliminating the threat to Ladoga-Karelia, and ensuring national survival with a sense of optimism. The arrival of Talvela and Pajari, according to Erik Heinrichs, "...overturned the depressed mood and fatigue...a fascinating example of what, in a war, can be accomplished by strong will power and strong mind." During the battle, Talvela was promoted to Major General and Pajari to full Colonel.

General Belyaev was dismissed from commanding on 16 December 1939, but preserved his rank. In June 1940 after re-attestation he was granted the rank of major general.

== Gallery ==
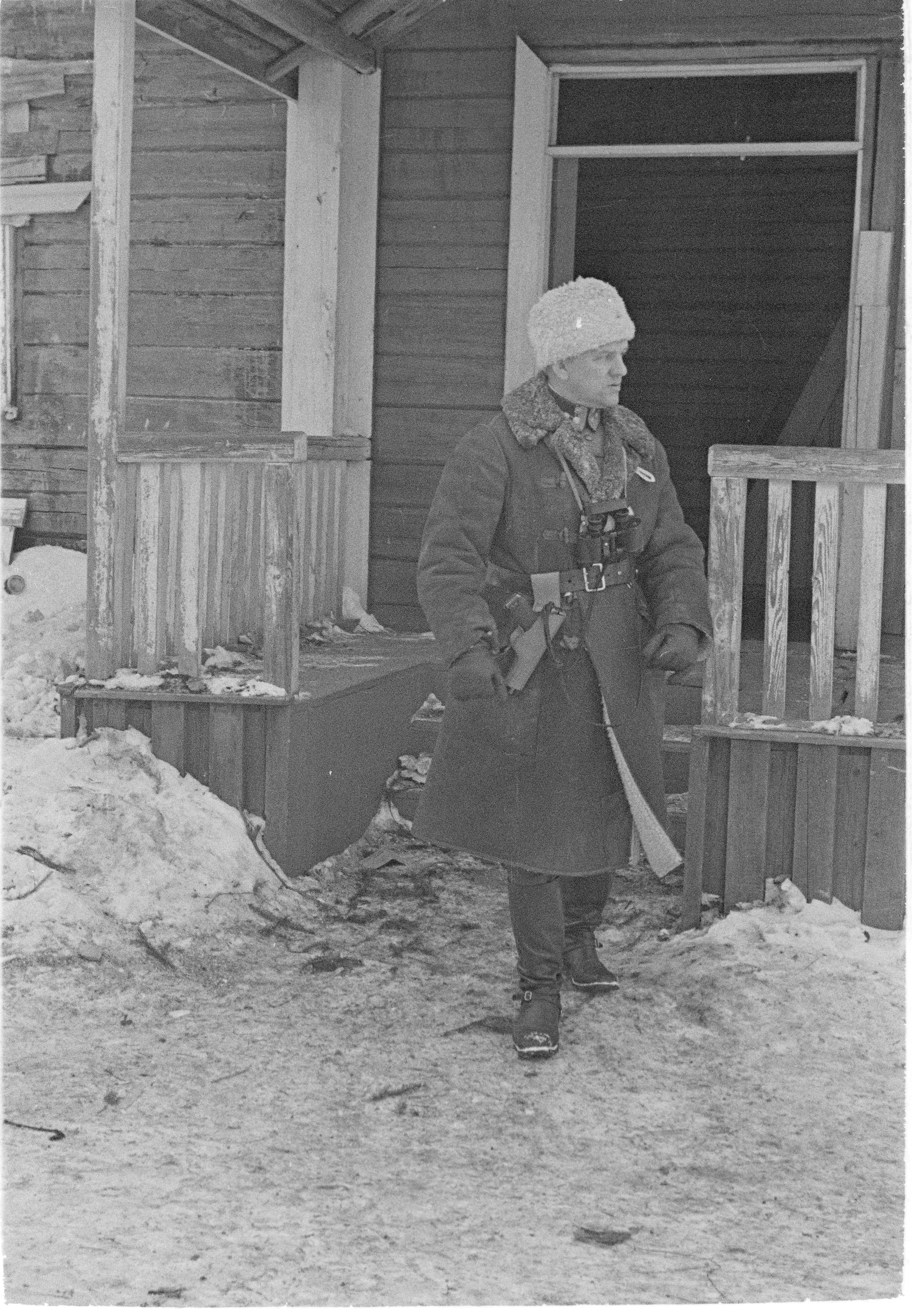
Aaro Pajari in Tolvajärvi

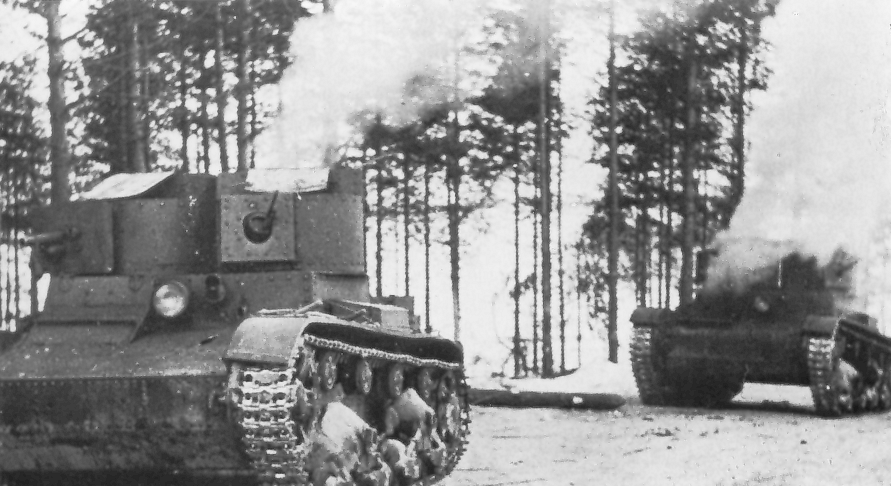
Two burning Soviet T-26s

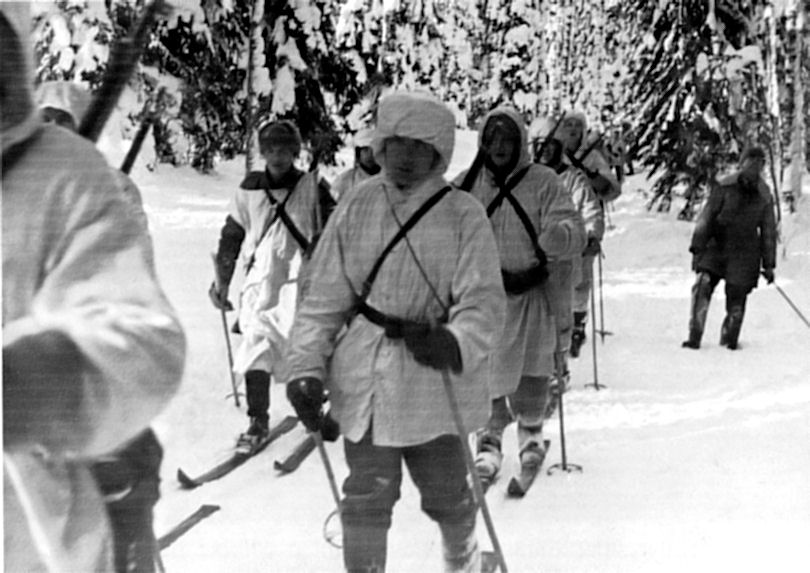
Finnish skiers of the Talvela Group

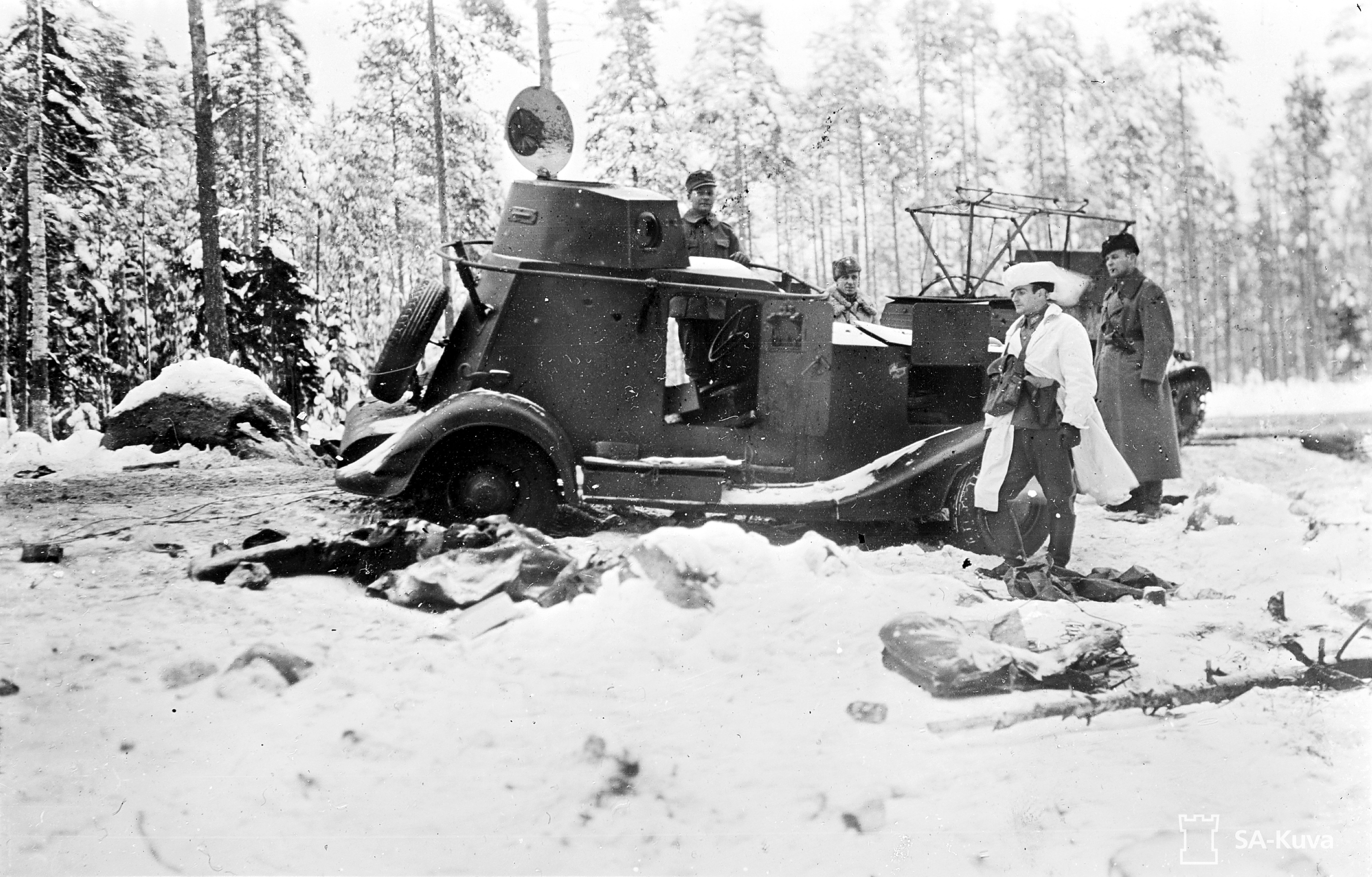
Destroyed Soviet armoured car is inspected by Finnish officers.

== See also ==
- List of Finnish military equipment of World War II
- List of Soviet Union military equipment of World War II

== Sources ==
=== English ===
- Chew, Allen (1971). The White Death: The Epic of the Soviet-Finnish Winter War. Michigan State University Press. ISBN 978-087-013-167-7.

=== External links ===
- (in Russian) How did the USSR lose a battle to Finland because of a sausage? – Politics and Weapons (Как СССР проиграл битву Финляндии из-за колбасы? - Политика и Оружие). Ukrlife (YouTube video). 12 December 2017.
