= Lake Tolvayarvi =

Lake in Suoyarvsky District, Karelia, Russia

Lake Tolvayarvi (Finnish: Tolvajärvi and Russian: Толваярви)
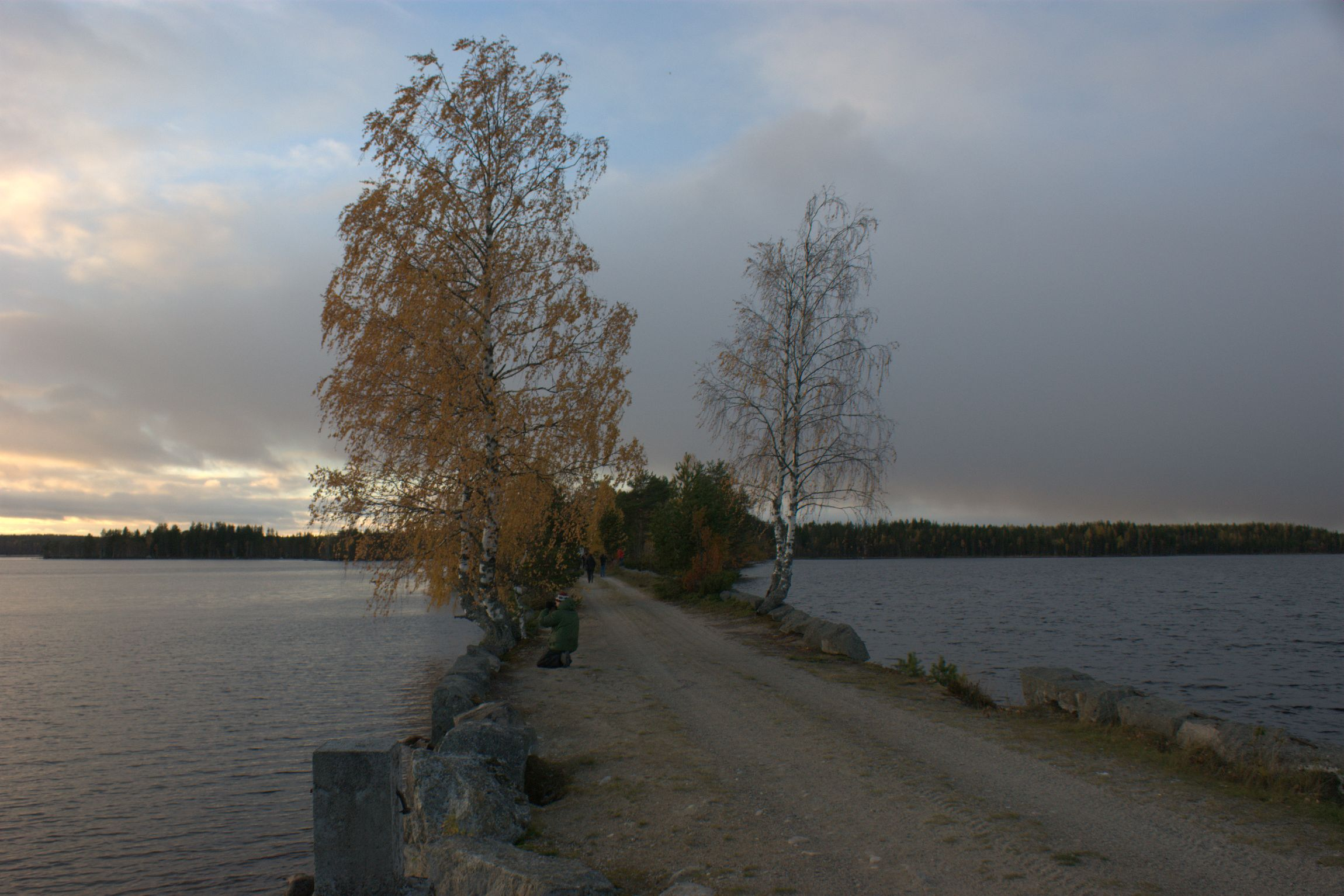

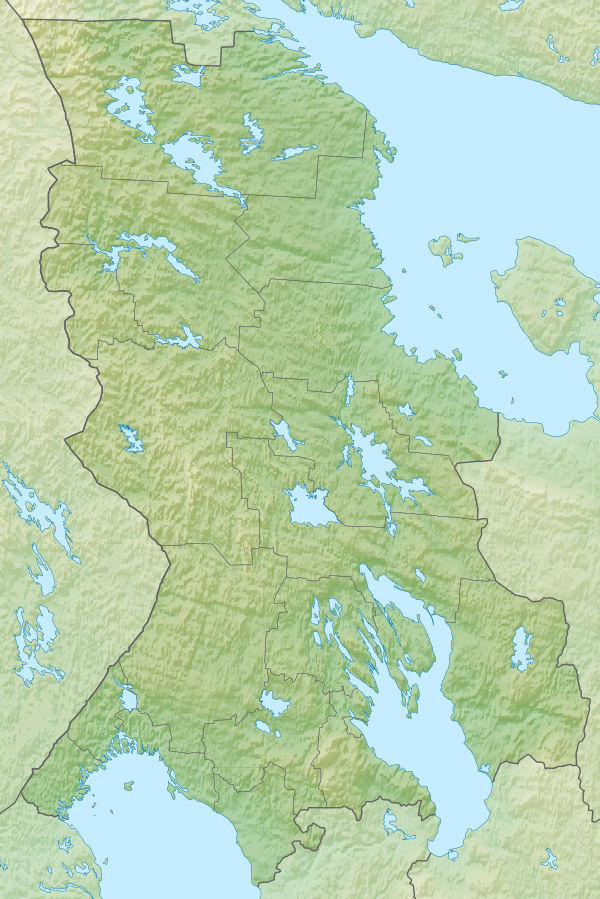
- Location within Karelia
- Location: Republic of Karelia
- Coordinates: 62°17′17″N 31°29′24″E
- Basin countries: Russia

Lake Tolvajärvi (Russian: Толваярви; Finnish: Tolvajärvi) is a group of lakes in the Republic of Karelia, in the Ladoga Karelia. It is a part of the Vuoksi drainage basin. The group of lakes have flows through rivers to the Finnish Lake Pielinen.

== History ==
Before the Winter War, the lake was part of the Korpiselkä municipality. During the war the area was a scene of the battle of Tolvajärvi. The Tolvajärvi area also served as a battlefield during the Continuation War.
