= Gogland =

Island in the Gulf of Finland

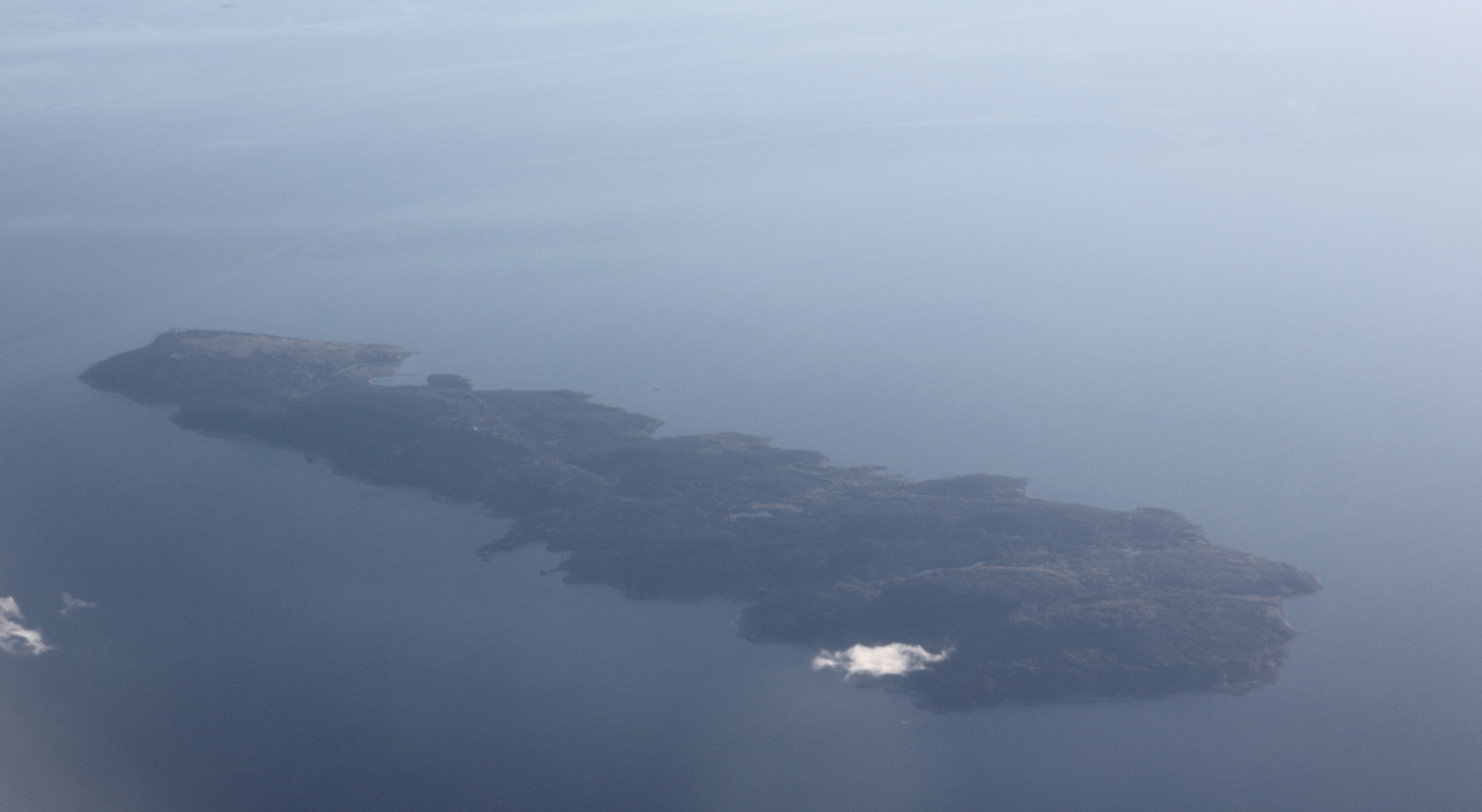

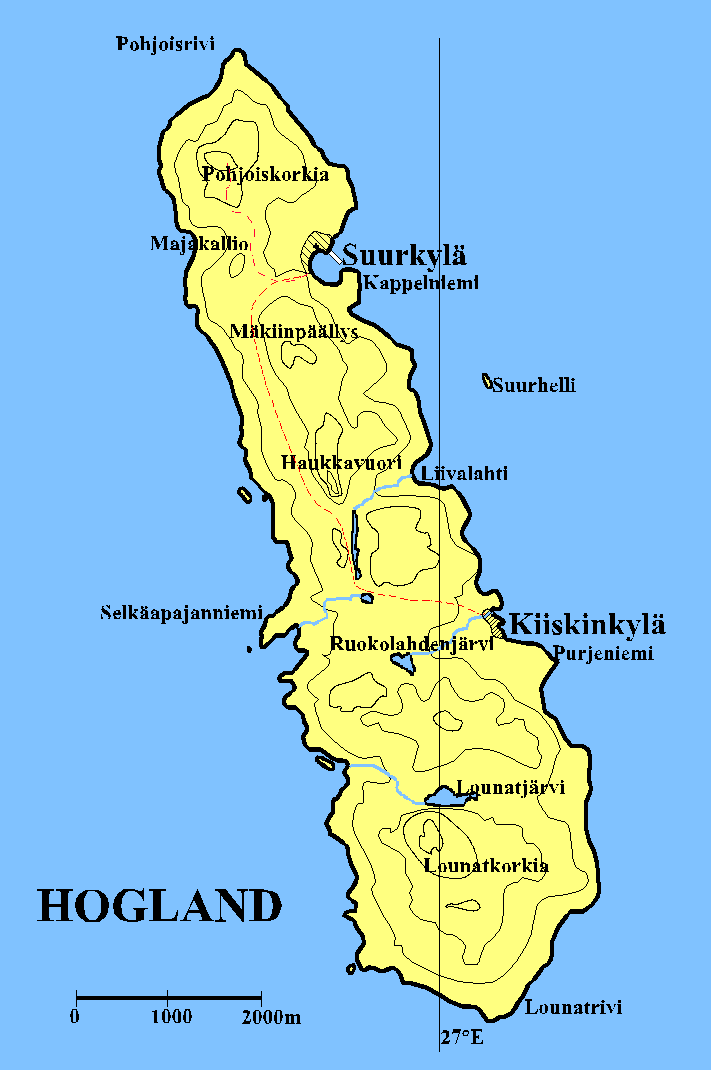
- Map of Hogland (contour lines every 30 metres)
- Interactive map of Gogland

Geography
- Coordinates: 60°03′21″N 026°59′02″E
- Adjacent to: Gulf of Finland
- Length: 11 km (6.8 mi)
- Width: 3 km (1.9 mi)

Administration
- Russia
- Oblast: Leningrad Oblast

Demographics
- Population: very low (2023)

Additional information
- Time zone: MSK (UTC+3)

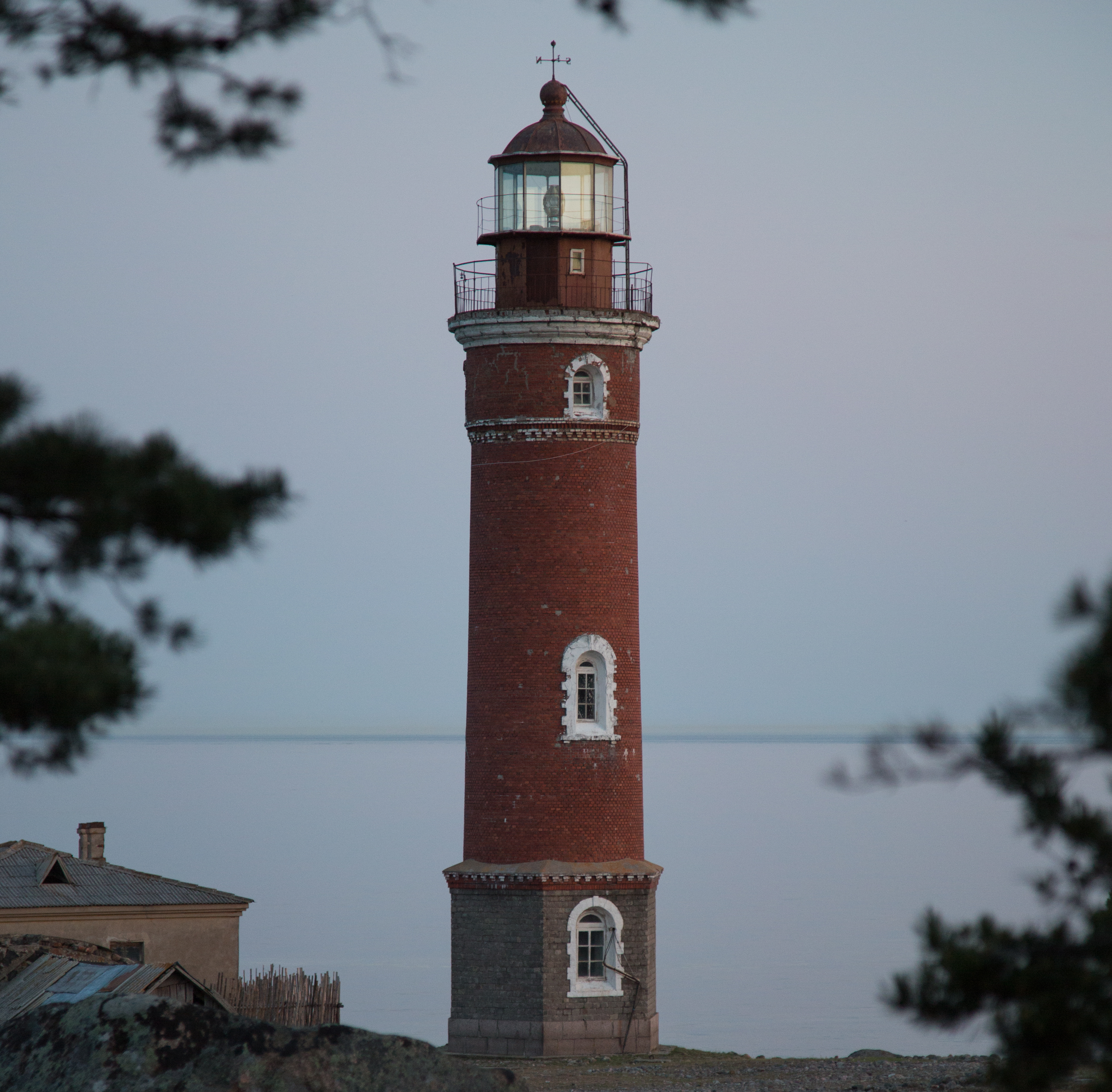
South lighthouse

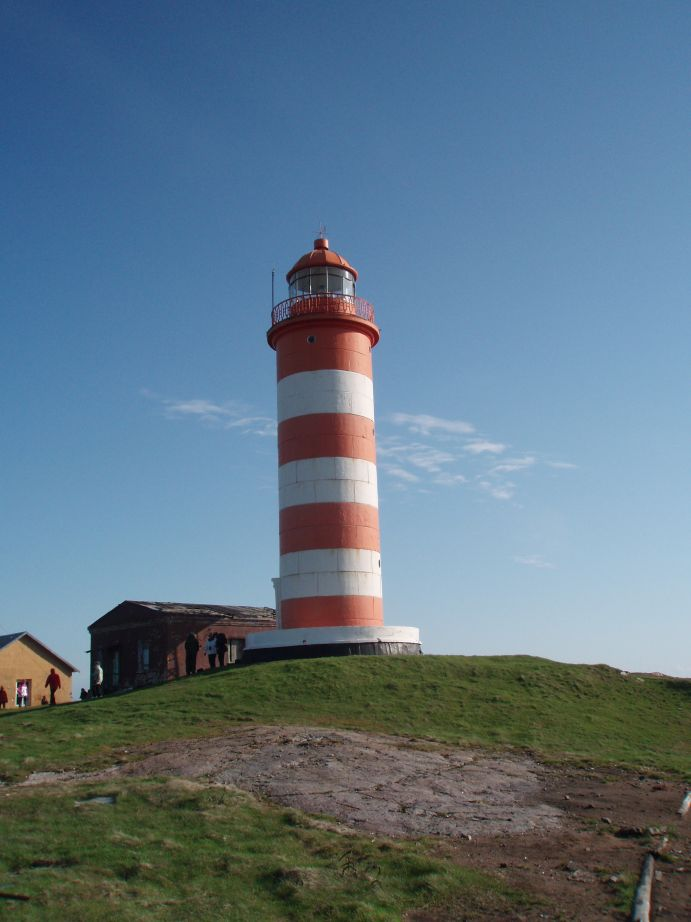
North lighthouse

Gogland or Hogland (Note: Russian: Гогланд, transliteration from original Swedish: Högland; Finnish: Suursaari, Estonian: Suursaar, German: Hochland.) is a Russian island in the Gulf of Finland in the eastern Baltic Sea, about 180 kilometres (110 mi) west from Saint Petersburg and 35 kilometres (22 mi) from the coast of Finland (near Kotka). The current population of the island is very low. It belongs to Russia's Kingiseppsky District in the Leningrad Oblast.

Gogland is 11 kilometres (6.8 mi) long and 1.5–3 kilometres (1–2 mi) wide. It has an area of approximately 21 km^{2} (8.1 sq mi); its highest point is 173 m (568 ft).

== Name ==
The Swedish name Högland (recorded as Högheland in 1547) means "Highland", which accurately describes the island's shape. The spelling Hog- reflects Low German influence. The Russian name Gogland (Гогланд) derives from the Swedish name, with Swedish H rendered as Russian Г (G). The Finnish and Estonian names Suursaari and Suursaar mean 'large island'.

== History ==
Gogland has been inhabited by ethnic Finns since at least the 16th century, but it has changed hands several times. Throughout much of its history the island was part of the Kingdom of Sweden, which controlled Finland; however, after the Great Northern War (as part of which, the action of 22 July 1713 took place near the island), the Russian Empire, under Tsar Peter I, claimed the island. Peter then had the island's first lighthouse built in 1723.

During the Russo-Swedish War (1788–1790) the Battle of Hogland, between the Russian and Swedish fleets, took place offshore, in July 1788.

During the Crimean War, four vessels of the Royal Navy—Arrogant, Cossack, Magicienne, and Ruby—silenced the Russian batteries at a fort on the island, while the Anglo-French fleet went on to attack Sveaborg before returning home.

Offshore there have been several notable shipwrecks. The crew of the three-mast clipper Amerika, which sank near the shore in October 1856, lie buried in an old Finnish cemetery.

After the Finnish War (1808–1809), Gogland officially passed to the Russian Empire, although it was made part of the newly created Grand Duchy of Finland which declared independence from Russia in 1917. Most of the island's population lived in two fishing villages administered from Viipuri (Vyborg).

Gogland is known as the location of one of the earliest radio contacts, which took place on 6 February 1900 under the supervision of Alexander Popov. (The time and details of this event vary slightly in different sources.)

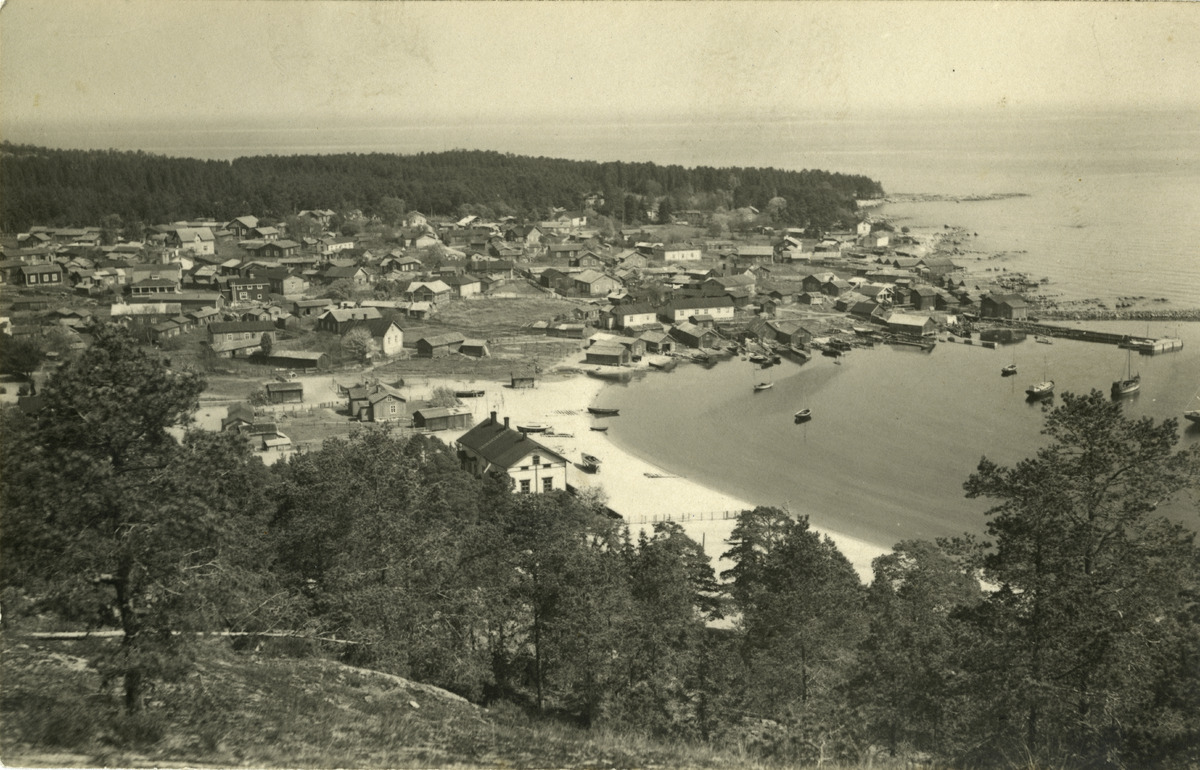
Suurkylä on Gogland in 1920s

Before World War II, Gogland had a permanent population of about 1,000, mainly engaged in fishing, seal hunting, and sea transport. Summer visitor numbers were of up to 10,000, contributing to income on the island. There was also a small soft drink factory on the island.

In March 1939, the Soviets asked Finland to lease Gogland and four small uninhabited islets for thirty years and cede rich and heavily populated areas on the Karelian isthmus, as they claimed they were vital for the defense of Leningrad, the second biggest Soviet city. In return, the Soviet Union offered a large slice of empty and unofficially disputed Karelian borderland in exchange. The Finns refused.

Soviet troops occupied the island during the Winter War (1939–1940), and the civilian population was evacuated. Gogland and nearby islands became strategically important during World War II, as German and Finnish forces used them to observe and maintain the massive belts of sea mines that kept the Soviet fleet bottled up in the eastern Gulf of Finland throughout the conflict.

Finnish forces captured Gogland during the Battle of Suursaari (December 1941 – April 1942). Later, in September 1944—Finland having ceased hostilities with the Soviet Union—the Germans attempted to take the island from their Finnish former allies but were repulsed with heavy losses in Operation Tanne Ost. Hogland became a Soviet possession at the end of the war.

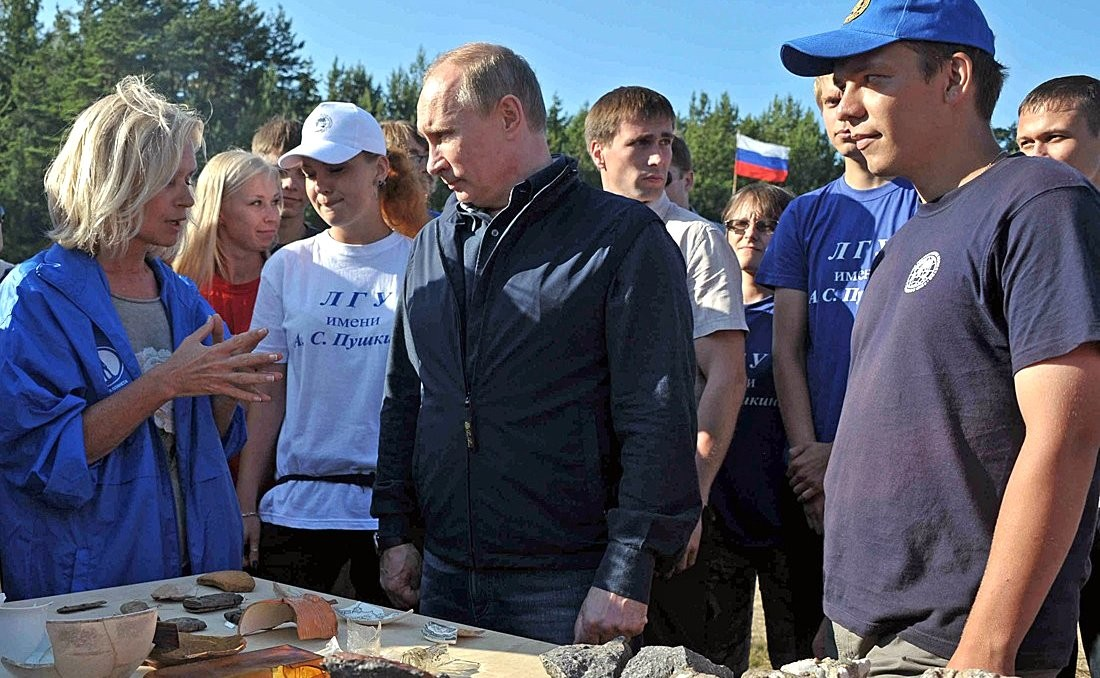
President Putin visited some Russian Geographical Society projects on Gogland, including a student archaeological field camp, on 15 July 2013

Since the island was nearly abandoned since World War II, it has been overgrown with partly impassable forest with little open area remaining. It has picturesque landscapes, but biodiversity is low. Animals found on the island include European mink, a critically endangered species, velvet scoter, vulnerable on a global scale, and three near-threatened species: the pond bat, Eurasian oystercatcher and northern lapwing.

Some tourists used to visit from Saint Petersburg and Finland. In 2006, however, Russian authorities declared Gogland a "border area", which means that foreign nationals are not allowed to travel to the island without special permits. This limits tourism from abroad to small groups, admitted one at a time, and adds extensive bureaucracy to applications for permission to visit the island.

In 2019, Russia built a military heliport with room for multiple helicopters and a refueling station on the island.

The current population of the island is very low, mainly servicing several military posts, a weather station and two lighthouses.

=== Landmarks ===
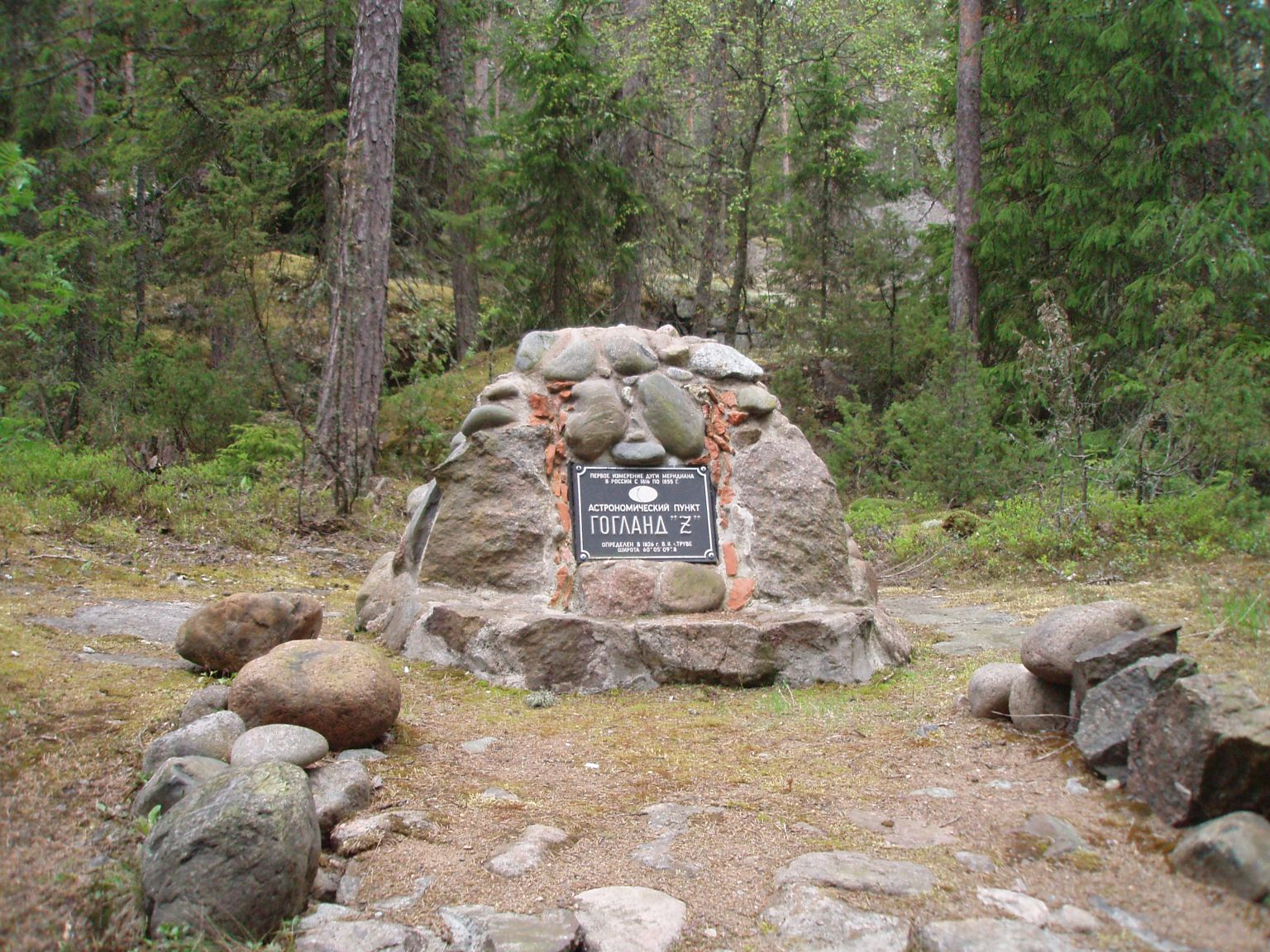
One of the two points of the Struve Geodetic Arc that are situated on Hogland

During the war years, both Soviet and Finnish troops built extensive fortifications, which are still found all over the island, along with discarded military equipment.

The log village of Suurkylä (Russian: Суркюля, Surkyulya) has been levelled and replaced with a few modern dwellings, possibly for a Soviet fishing collective farm, as well as some military facilities.

The island is renowned for its rugged scenery, including five lakes. Since 1826, the hill Mäkiinpäällys has two of the points in the Struve Geodetic Arc.

== Climate ==
Gogland has a humid continental climate (Dfb) with oceanic influences from the Gulf of Finland.

Climate data for Gogland (1991–2020 normals, extremes 1971–present)
Month	Jan	Feb	Mar	Apr	May	Jun	Jul	Aug	Sep	Oct	Nov	Dec	Year
Record high °C (°F)	6.6 (43.9)	8.3 (46.9)	10.7 (51.3)	21.4 (70.5)	26.7 (80.1)	31.7 (89.1)	30.9 (87.6)	30.3 (86.5)	23.7 (74.7)	19.1 (66.4)	12.2 (54.0)	7.3 (45.1)	31.7 (89.1)
Daily mean °C (°F)	−2.9 (26.8)	−4.2 (24.4)	−1.5 (29.3)	3.1 (37.6)	8.8 (47.8)	13.9 (57.0)	17.8 (64.0)	17.2 (63.0)	12.8 (55.0)	7.3 (45.1)	2.8 (37.0)	−0.2 (31.6)	6.2 (43.2)
Record low °C (°F)	−33.2 (−27.8)	−27.0 (−16.6)	−24.6 (−12.3)	−10.0 (14.0)	−5.1 (22.8)	1.4 (34.5)	6.2 (43.2)	4.4 (39.9)	−2.9 (26.8)	−8.4 (16.9)	−13.0 (8.6)	−24.2 (−11.6)	−28.8 (−19.8)
Source: http://www.pogodaiklimat.ru/doc/normals_1991_2020_2.txt http://pogodaiklimat.ru/msummary/22907.htm
