= Ragnar Nordström =

Finnish military officer and shipowner (1894–1982)

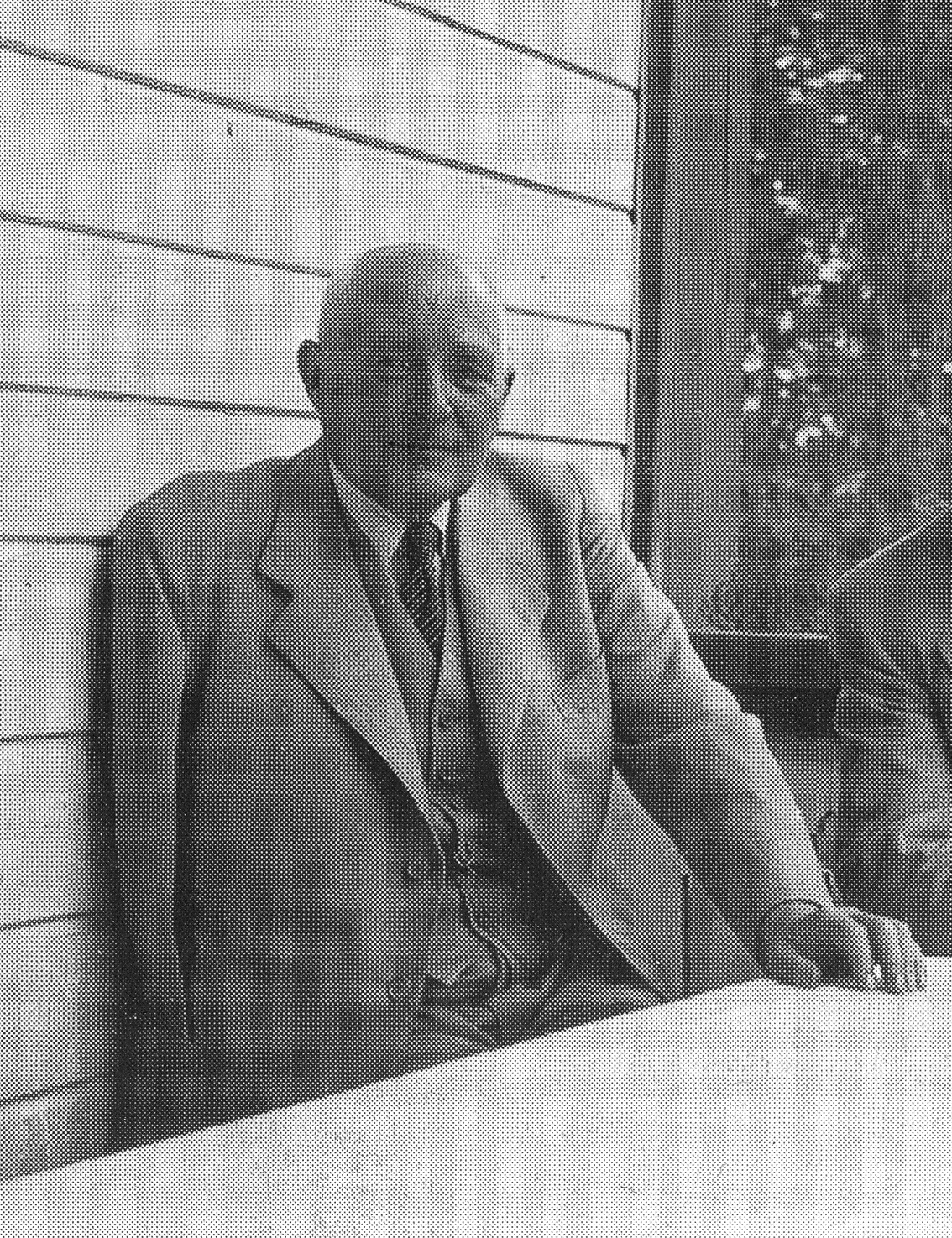
- Born: Gustaf Ragnar Enos Nordström; 16 January 1894; Lovisa, Grand Duchy of Finland
- Died: 25 December 1982 (aged 88); Lovisa, Finland
- Occupations: Military officer, shipowner, industrialist
- Known for: Jäger movement; Aunus expedition; Finland's largest private shipowner
- Spouse: Nina Seise (m. 1921)

Gustaf Ragnar Enos Nordström (16 January 1894 – 25 December 1982) was a Finnish military officer, shipowner and industrialist. He was active in the Jäger movement, the Aunus expedition and the Lapua movement, and became Finland's largest private shipowner during the interwar period. A lifelong anti-communist, he was forced into exile in Sweden after the Second World War.

== Biography ==
=== Jäger movement and Civil War ===
Nordström joined the Jäger movement in 1915 and participated in the Finnish Civil War in 1918, where he was wounded at the Battle of Tampere and lost his right arm. Despite this he continued to serve in the army. Together with Gunnar von Hertzen he subsequently played a leading role in organising the Aunus expedition of 1919, which aimed to support East Karelian resistance against Bolshevik rule. The expedition ended in defeat.

=== Business career ===
During the 1920s and 1930s Nordström built up a shipping and fishing conglomerate, the Nordström Group. The company was a pioneer in fisheries and fish processing in Petsamo, operating through Finska fiskeri Ab in the late 1930s, and during the interwar period held Finland's largest tonnage. The flag of his shipping company Ab R. Nordström & Co Oy bore the Karelian colours, reflecting his lifelong commitment to the cause of East Karelia.

=== Winter War and Continuation War ===
Nordström was a committed opponent of Bolshevism. After the outbreak of the Winter War he travelled to Stockholm and secured arms and equipment for Finnish forces in northern Finland. In the early phase of the Continuation War he helped plan the military administration of East Karelia and held a senior post within it during the offensive phase of the war.

=== Exile and later life ===
In late August 1945 the communist-influenced State Police attempted to arrest Nordström at his estate in Övertorneå near the Swedish border. He managed to cross into Sweden, where he spent more than three years in exile. During this time he used his extensive contacts to assist those who had been forced to flee Finland following the weapons cache affair of 1944.

After returning to Finland in 1948, Nordström resumed his shipping business, which had suffered severely during the war years. He retained until the end of his life the conviction that the Soviet system would collapse and the occupied peoples regain their freedom. His memoirs were written in Sweden on the condition that they would be published only after the fall of communism in Russia. The work Voitto tai kuolema (Victory or Death) was published in 1996, fourteen years after his death.

== Bibliography ==
- Voitto tai kuolema. Jääkärieverstin elämä ja perintö (1996)
