= Aaro Pajari =

Finnish general (1897–1949)

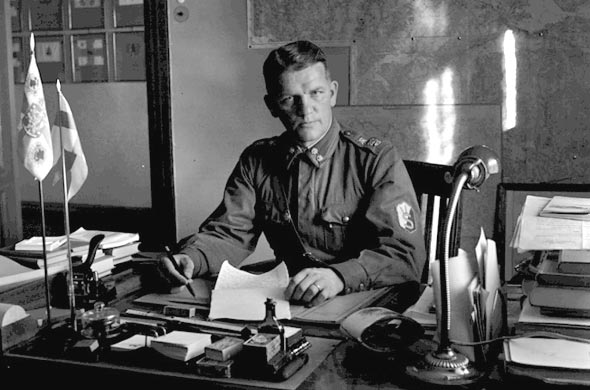
- Aaro Pajari
- Born: 17 July 1897; Asikkala, Grand Duchy of Finland, Russian Empire
- Died: 14 October 1949 (aged 52); Kokkola, Finland
- Burial place: Kalevankangas Cemetery
- Military career
- Allegiance: Finland
- Branch: Finnish Army
- Service years: 1917–1949
- Rank: Major General
- Conflicts: World War I; Finnish Civil War; World War II; Winter War; Battle of Tolvajarvi; Continuation War; Lapland War
- Awards: Mannerheim Cross of Liberty (Twice)

Aaro Olavi Pajari (17 July 1897 – 14 October 1949) was a major general in the Finnish Army. During World War II, he became one of the four double recipients of the Mannerheim Cross 2nd Class.

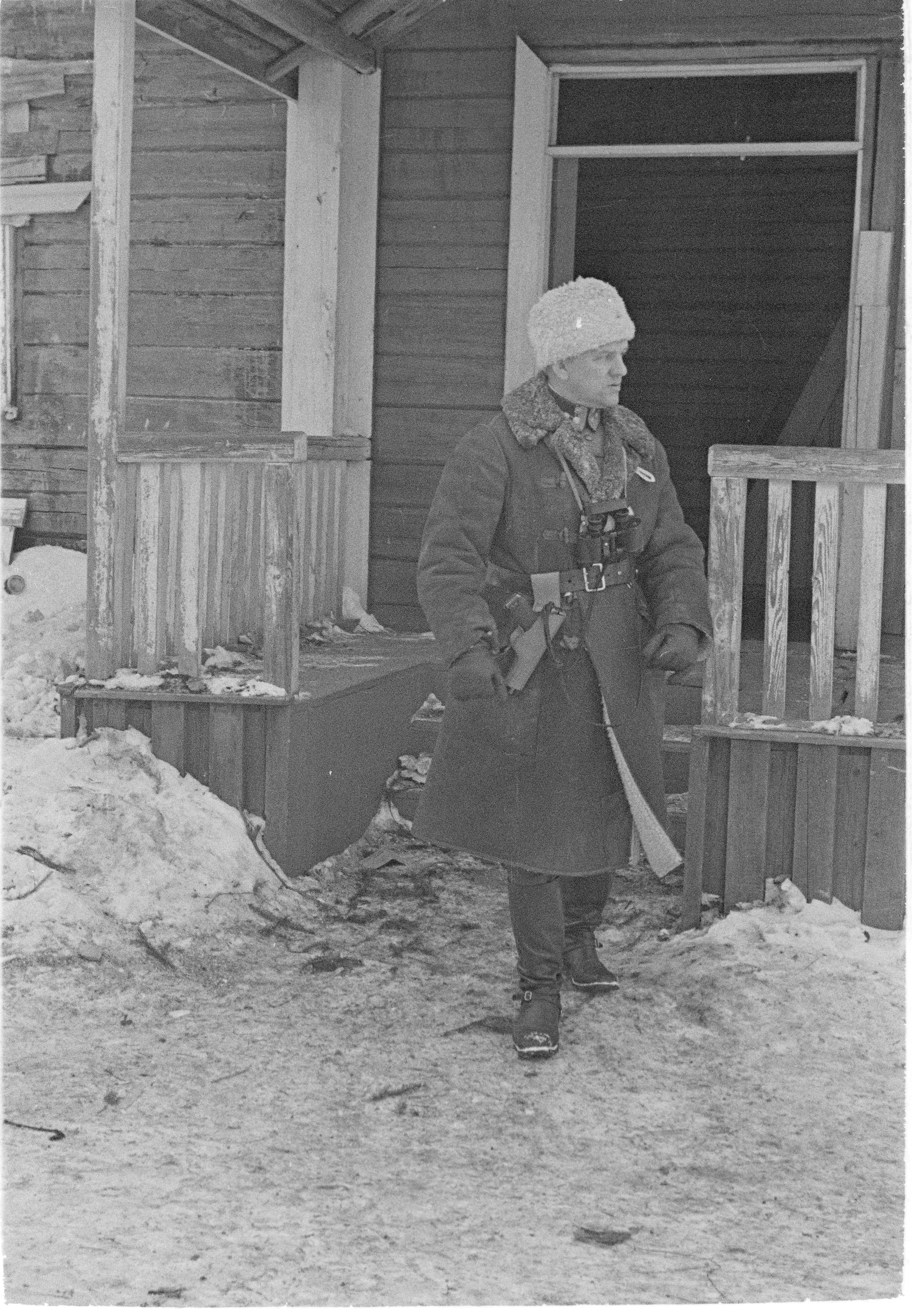
Colonel Pajari in front of Tolvajärvi's headquarters. SA-kuvat

His greatest achievement was the Finnish victory at the Battle of Tolvajärvi in the Winter War, where his small Finnish force smashed a far larger Soviet army. Pajari went on to serve throughout the Winter, Continuation, and Lapland wars, becoming famous for his success in leading small unit, and guerrilla style operations.

== Early life ==
Aaro Pajari was born in 1897 to politician and teacher Olli Pajari and Maria Helena Laatunen. In 1917 he joined the White Guard and participated in the Finnish Civil War as a company commander. Pajari was wounded in the battles of Oulu and Heinola. After the civil war Pajari remained in the military and took part in the Aunus expedition.

In 1924–1926 he attended the War College. He subsequently served as district commander of the Civil Guard in Tampere. In 1933, during a Social Democratic party congress held in the city, he ordered Civil Guard members to remove red banners from flagpoles on Hämeenkatu street. He was punished for this by the Supreme Court of War with twenty days of house arrest, but was widely appreciated in other circles.

In 1928 Pajari married Kaija Björklund.

== Second World War ==
At the start of the Winter War, Lieutenant Colonel Pajari had JR 16 (Jalkaväkirykmentti 16) under his command. Pajari led the first Finnish successful mission in the Winter War by defeating the Soviet Union 139th Division in the Battle of Tolvajärvi. He was promoted to colonel on 18 December 1939. In Tolvajärvi, Detachment Pajari was part of Group Talvela. After Talvela moved to the Isthmus, Pajari became the commander of the group.

In the beginning of the Continuation War, Colonel Pajari commanded 18th division, which carried out a breakthrough in August 1941, for which Pajari was appointed on 14 September 1941 as the Knights of the Mannerheim Cross number 12. He was promoted to General Major on 3 October 1941. In 1942 he led the conquest of Suursaari. Pajari was made the 3rd Division commander on 21 October 1943. During Soviet strategic Karelian offensive June 1944 Pajari commanded the 3rd Division during major battles at two Finnish defensive lines (VT-asema, VKT-asema).

At the Lapland War General Major Pajari commanded the 3rd division during the conquest of Tornio from Nazi Germany in early October 1944. The operation, in which Detachment Pajari made a daring landing behind German lines, contributed significantly to sparing the cities of Tornio and Kemi from major destruction. Pajari subsequently captured Rovaniemi as well. For his achievements in the Lapland War, he was appointed as a Knight of the Mannerheim Cross for the second time (one of the four double knights) on 16 October 1944.

In October 1944 Marshal Mannerheim personally presented Pajari with his second Mannerheim Cross — but Pajari refused to accept it unless his regimental commanders were awarded corresponding decorations. Mannerheim agreed, but after handing over the cross he ordered General Hugo Österman to arrest Pajari on the instructions of the Soviet Control Commission, which alleged that Pajari had ordered the execution of prisoners of war during the conquest of Suursaari. Pajari was held for nearly two months before the Control Commission agreed to release him, and the allegations of executions were never pursued further.

== Pajari's Boys ==
Pajari had achieved a legendary reputation. He was a controversial and colourful personality who was criticized by many colleagues, but he was appreciated by his men. There was an exceptionally strong bond between Pajari and his men. Even during the war, men began to call themselves "the Sons of Pajari".

These sons included Finlayson's social director and member of parliament Eero Kivelä, Tampere Mayor Erkki Lindfors, and a teacher & the chairman of Tampere City Council, Lauri Santamäki. After the wars, Lindfors and Santamäki created the Tampere Arms Shaft, which had a major impact on the development of Tampere.

== Death ==
Pajari suffered from heart ailments and died of a heart attack on a business trip to Ostrobothnia in 1949. He is buried in the Kalevala Cemetery in Tampere. The memorial stone for Pajari, designed by Unto Ojonen, was erected in Asikkala 6 March 1977.
