= Coat of arms of Karelia =

The coat of arms of Karelia may refer to

- Coat of arms of the Republic of Karelia in the Russian Federation
- Coat of arms of the Province of Karelia in Finland

== See also ==
- Emblem of the Karelo-Finnish Soviet Socialist Republic 1941–1956
