= Karelian Labor Commune =

Autonomous labour commune in Northern Europe (1920-1923)

Karelian Labour Commune Karjalan työkommuuni (Finnish) Карельская трудовая коммуна, Karelskaya trudovaya kommuna (Russian)
- 1920-1923
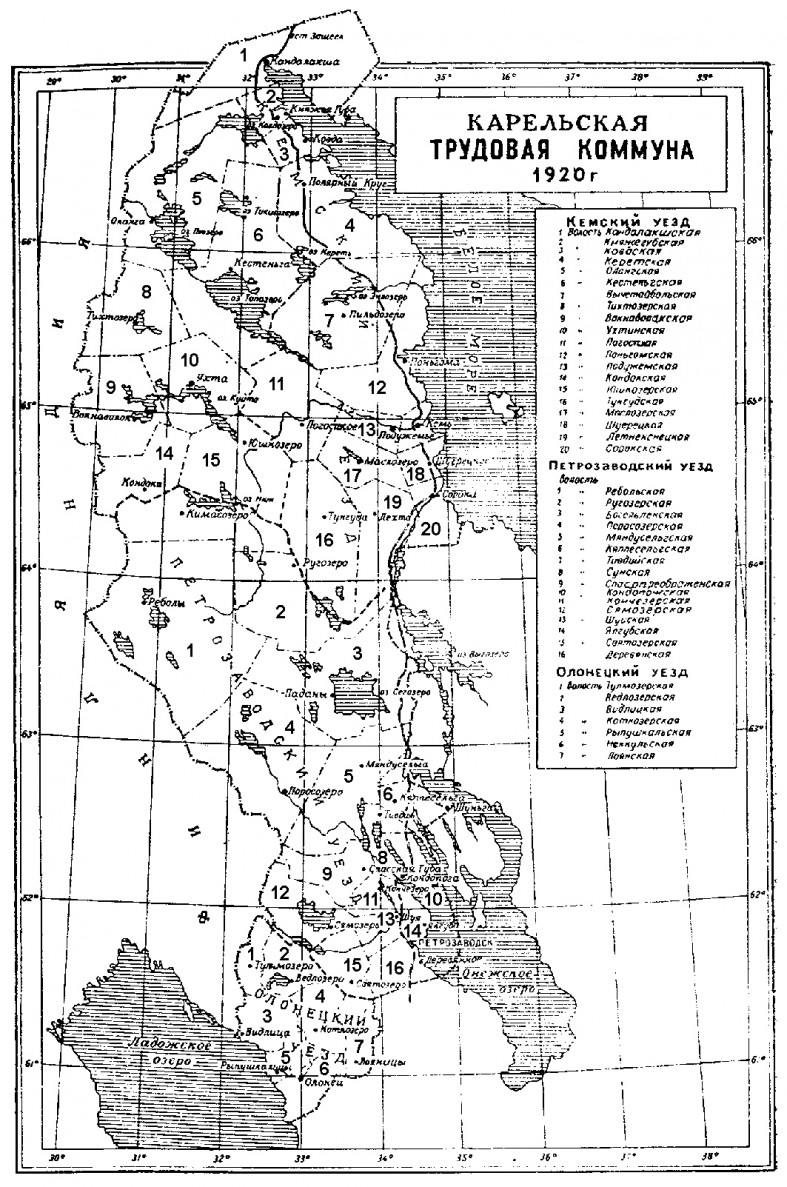
- Area claimed and controlled by the Karelian Labor Commune
- Capital: Petrozavodsk
- Administrative centers: Petrozavodsk & Olonets
- Official languages: Finnish; Russian

Government
  - Chairman: Edvard Gylling
- History
  - Established: 8 June 1920
  - Disestablished: 25 July 1923

Population
  - 1920: 145,753
  - 1923: 210,211
Preceded by	Succeeded by
Karelian United Government	Karelian ASSR
- Today part of: Republic of Karelia as a subject of Russian Federation

The Karelian Labour Commune (Note: Russian: Карельская трудовая коммуна, romanized: Karelskaya trudovaya kommuna; Finnish: Karjalan työkommuuni) was an autonomous region of Russia established in 1920 following the successes of the Red Army's incursion into the Republic of Uhtua, to undermine and discredit the separatist movements and to make Finland give up on attempting to liberate East Karelia shortly before the beginning of negotiations for the Treaty of Tartu and during the Kinship Wars. Edvard Gylling and Yrjö Sirola, former members of the executive organ of the rebel Reds in the Finnish Civil War 1918, the Finnish People's Delegation, met with Vladimir Lenin in the Kremlin to propose autonomy for East Karelia within Russia. The Commune was founded on 8 June 1920 and was disestablished on 25 July 1923 and succeeded by the Karelian Autonomous Soviet Socialist Republic, following the end of the Kinship Wars.

== Government ==
=== Karelian Revolutionary Committee & the Executive Committee of Olonets ===
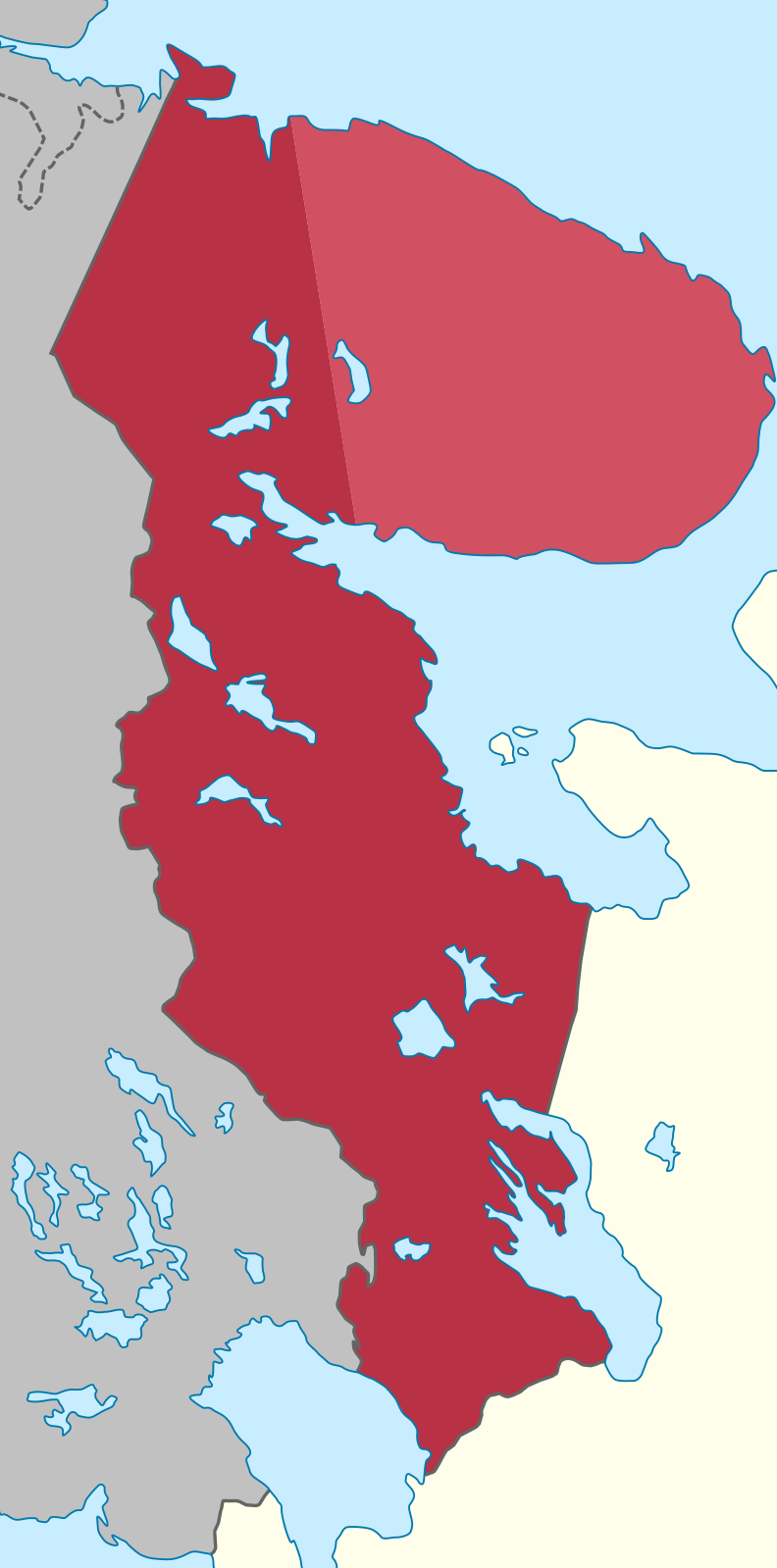
Proposed borders of the Commune as outlined by Gylling in March 1920: Primary claims Claims on the eastern Kola Peninsula

The Government of the Karelian Labor Commune was run by the Karelian Revolutionary Committee (Karrevkom), which was headed by Edvard Gylling, a former member of the government of the FSWR. Much of the leadership of the Karelian Labor Commune were that of Red Finns, who were expatriates that got government jobs, such as Gylling, Aleksandr Šotman and et cetera. Around 20,000 Finnish people, mostly people who were a part of the Finnish People's Delegation or Red Guards fled to the Commune following or nearing the end of the Finnish Civil War.

The Capital of the Commune was chosen to be Petrozavodsk. This was a problem as this led to the formation of two administrative centers for the Commune, for the existence of the Executive Committee of Olonets. The existence of two administrative centers led to infighting and petty disputes, such as the demarcation of the border based on either ethnic, legal/historical or economic boundaries.

The borders of the Karelian Labor Commune were drawn in such a way that the Karelian people and/or Finnish people would form to be the majority of the region, as according to the census carried out in August 1920, 145,753 people lived there, of which 60.8%, or 89,951 people, were ethnically Karelians. The bitter infighting led to the eastern border to run roughly along the Murmansk railroad from the White Sea to Lake Onega, so that Shunga, Shyoltozero and the mouth of the River Svir would remain outside of the Commune, to limit the number of Russian people within the borders of the labor commune.

The Karelian Labour Commune's population, calculated within its expanded 1922 boundaries, was 210,211 (Note: The population figure is according to the August 1920 Soviet census population.), of whom 42.7% were ethnically Karelians, while Russians made up 55.7%. By 1923, the Commune's territory had been expanded to around 144,600 km², following both the VTsIK's decision on 18 September 1922 to transfer territory from the abolished Olonets Governorate to the Commune, incorporating the Povenets district and part of the Pudozh district, which were mainly populated by ethnic Russians. Alongside the 1923 incorporation of five Pomor-populated volosts of the Onega Uezd, Arkhangelsk Governorate.

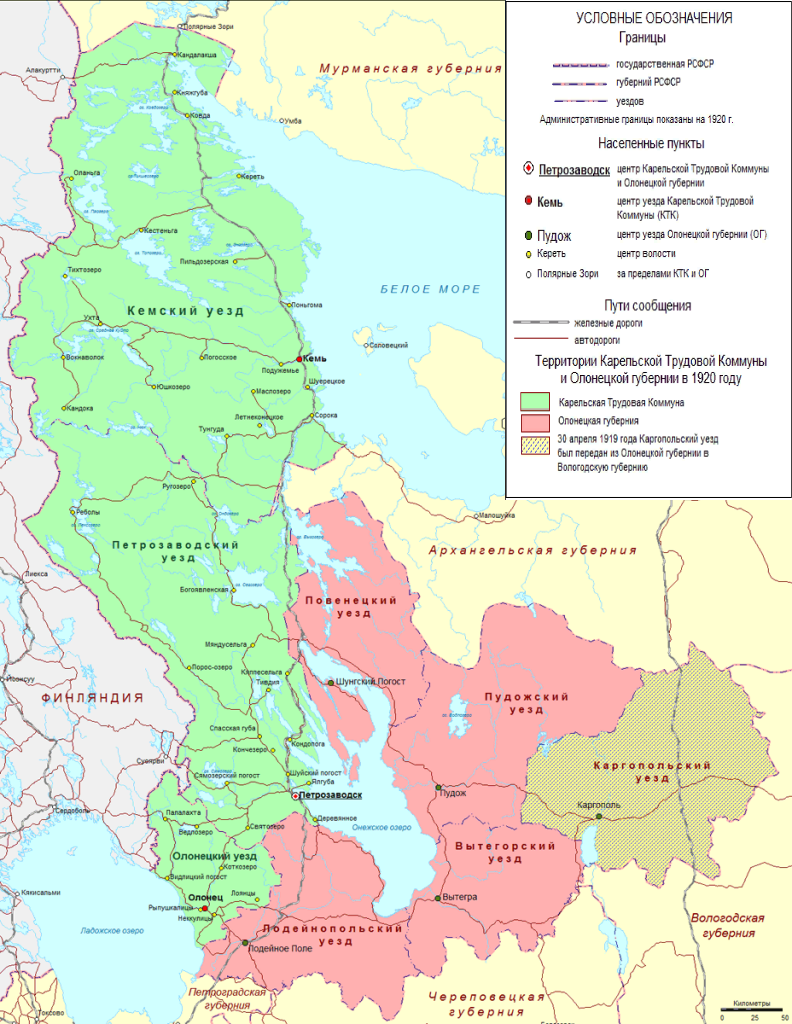
Map of the situation between the Executive Committee of Olonets (red) and the Karelian Revolutionary Committee (Karrevkom, green).

The borders which the Executive Committee of Olonets wished for were those of the Olonets Governorate of that under the Russian Empire. As they saw it to be the legitimate option as the Governorate had never been formally dissolved and in de jure control of the Executive Committee of Olonets.

==== Karelization ====
Gylling was infavour of Karelization or Karelianization, which in his words meant:

Karelization means that the Karelian dialects have civil rights everywhere, that Karelians in all offices and meetings will be able to explain their business in their own dialect. But if one thinks of Karelization as meaning that one wants to use the Karelian dialects, which often are mixed up with Russian words more than half of the time, as a literary language, then Karelization is naturally irrational.

This led to the policy of regions that spoke majority Karelian language or Finnish language would only have their services in the Finnish language. The policy of Karelization was meant to make the Karelian people not support the Karelian United Government and the Finnish Government due to their sponsoring of anti-communist and separatist movements.

=== All-Karelian Congress of Soviets ===
The 1. All-Karelian Congress of Soviets of Workers', Peasants' and Red Army Deputies was held between 11 and 19 February 1921. The 1. All-Karelian Congress of Soviets elected the chairman of the Karelian Regional Executive Committee (Karoblispolkom), which had jurisdiction over all territory other than that in conflict with the Executive Committee of Olonets. 144 delegates took part in this session of congress and Edward Gylling was elected to be chairman of the Karoblispolkom.

The All-Karelian Congress of Soviets of Workers', Peasants' and Red Army Deputies held a congress in Petrozavodsk between 1–3 July 1920 and it was a de facto election between the 142 delegates representing 24 Karelian volosts of the Karelian Labor Commune, within the congress the delegates represented around 105,000 Karelian people. The All-Karelian Congress of Soviets was held to see the opinions of regions relating to the subject of independence, joining Finland or staying in the RSFSR. The results of the congress were that 88.3% of all respondents were in favor of remaining a part of the RSFSR, 10.8% were in favor of independence, and 0.9% were in favor of joining Finland.

The congress was filled with regionalist debate, with the Executive Committee of Olonets having wishes to stay within the RSFSR, while the White Karelia region wishing more for outright independence or joining Finland. The congress itself was promoted by the Executive Committee of Olonets on April 28, 1920, when they adopted a special resolution in which a congress would be held on the subject of independence, joining Finland or staying within Russia for Karelia. The All-Karelian Congress of Soviets was however not only related to independence, as it also adopted an order for the Karelian Revolutionary Committee to take measures to combat hunger, in order to prevent a famine, restore agriculture, fisheries and the forestry industry.

The All-Karelian Congress of Soviets of Workers', Peasants' and Red Army Deputies became the supreme state power of the Karelian Labour Commune following a resolution on 8 June 1920 when the Karrevkom resigned due it having completed its temporary task.

=== Joint Presidium & the Provincial Executive Committee ===
The Karelian Revolutionary Committee (Karrevkom) despite its continued authority over the Executive Committee of Olonets, resorted to a Joint Presidium between the two groups, which was called a provincial executive committee, alongside this a lot of political power was granted to a Council of People's Commissars (CPC). The formation of the Provincial Executive Committee did not solve a lot of problems, as areas which were inside the Olonets Governorate but outside the reach of the CPC still were under de jure control of the Executive Committee of Olonets. These areas outside the Commune which retained their powers were neighbouring areas of Petrozavodsk and Povenets.

This led to the Administrative Commission of the Presidium proposing to include the Petrozavodsk and Povenets unincluded regions, this was rejected by all parties, including the People's Commissariat of Internal Affairs of the RSFSR, who rejected the proposal. This led to the proposal being given to the All-Russian Central Executive Committee and the Council of People's Commissars, who rejected the proposal on 11 September 1920, the rejection to the proposal was signed by Vladimir Lenin, and it was said to be a need for the preservation of the old province, and its subject economic, food and land departments. P.F. Anokhin was later elected the chairman of the Presidium in August 1920.

== Economy ==
The Karelian Labor Commune was faced with a labor shortage due to conflict in the region, this alongside the political motives of the Bolshevik Party had established various forced labor camps within its territory, such as a sawmill in Neglinka which was run by the Cheka until Gylling requested it for it to be run by the Karelian Economic Council. The extreme infighting within the Karelian Labor Commune led to the sporadic division of resources between the Executive Committee of Aunus and the Karelian Economic Council, which was headed by Šotman. The Karelian Labor Commune had been given economic and administrative autonomy relating to their resources by the Government in Moscow.

== Planned expansion ==
The Karelian Labor Commune was not meant to be just limited to East Karelia or Karelia as a whole, the intentions reflecting the sometimes debated intentions of the Karelo-Finnish SSR in its expansion. It is often thought that the Commune was meant to be a runway for the expansion of the communist revolution to Finland. These ideas were killed with the Socialism in One Country policy applied by Stalin, in result of the Soviet failure in the Polish–Soviet War.
