= Pro-independence movements in the Russian Civil War =

Post–Russian Empire states

Pro-independence movements in the Russian Civil War within the territory of the former Russian Empire sought the creation of independent nation states that were not aligned with the Bolsheviks after the October Revolution. Many pro-independence movements emerged after the dissolution of the Russian Empire and fought in the Russian Civil War.

The following list presents some of the pro-independence movements and the conflicts they were involved in during this period.

== Western periphery ==
- Finland (independence from 1917)
  - White Guard
  - Kingdom of Finland
  - Finnish Socialist Workers' Republic

Finnish Civil War
Heimosodat

Viena expedition
Aunus expedition

- United Baltic Duchy
  - Baltic State (Lasted from April to September 1918)
  - Duchy of Courland and Semigallia (1918)
- Estonia (independence from 1918)
  - Estonian Provisional Government
  - Commune of the Working People of Estonia

Estonian War of Independence

- Latvia (independence from 1918)
  - Latvian Provisional Government
  - Iskolat
  - Latvian Socialist Soviet Republic

Latvian War of Independence

- Lithuania (independence from 1918)
  - Perloja
  - Republic of Vandžiogala
  - Republic of Babtai
  - Central Lithuania[pro-Polish]
  - Lithuanian Soviet Socialist Republic

Lithuanian Wars of Independence

Polish–Lithuanian War

- Poland (independence from 1918)
  - Zakopane
  - Tarnobrzeg

Polish–Ukrainian War
Polish–Soviet War
Polish–Lithuanian War

- Soviet Republic of Naissaar
- West Ukrainian People's Republic (independence 1918–1919/1923; annexed by Poland in 1919)[pro-West]
- Ukrainian People's Republic (independence 1917–1921; partitioned between Poland and the Ukrainian SSR)[pro-East]
  - Ukrainian State
  - Komancza (Eastern Lemko Republic)[pro-Ukrainian]
  - Hutsul
  - Kholodny Yar Republic
  - Mliivska Republic
  - Republic of the Black Forest
  - Medvyn Rebellion
  - Donetsk–Krivoy Rog Soviet Republic
  - Odessa Soviet Republic
  - Bashtanka Republic
  - Ukrainian People's Republic of Soviets
  - Ukrainian Soviet Republic

Ukrainian War of Independence

Ukrainian–Soviet War

Polish–Ukrainian War

- Belarusian People's Republic (independence 1918–1919; partitioned between Poland and the Belarusian SSR)
  - Socialist Soviet Republic of Byelorussia
  - Socialist Soviet Republic of Lithuania and Belorussia
  - Koydan Independent Republic
- Crimea (independence 1917–1918; annexed by the Russian SFSR in 1921)
  - Crimean Regional Government
  - Crimean Frontier Government
- Moldavian Democratic Republic (united with Romania in 1918)
- Lemko Republic (independence 1918–1920; annexed by Poland in 1920)[pro-Russian]
- Galician Soviet Socialist Republic (independence 1920; liquidated in 1920)[puppet state]

== European Russia ==
- East European Russia
  - Bashkiria (autonomy and de facto independence 1917–1919; joined the Russian SFSR)
  - Chuvashia (Independence 1918; annexed by the Russian SFSR)
  - Idel-Ural (independence 1917–1918; annexed by the Russian SFSR)
  - Provisional Regional Government of the Urals (independence 1918; annexed by the Provisional All-Russian Government )
- North European Russia
  - North Ingria
  - Committee of Uhtua
  - Republic of Uhtua
  - Provisional Government of White Karelia
  - Provisional Government of Karelia
  - Olonets Government of Southern Karelia
  - Karelian United Government
  - Republic of Eastern Karelia
  - Karelian Temporary Committee
  - Center Committee Karelian Village of Uhtua
- South European Russia
  - Kuban Rada (formed into April, 1917. Became the Kuban People's Republic in 1918)
  - Kuban People's Republic (independence 1918–1920; annexed by the Russian SFSR)
  - Don Republic (independence 1918–1919; annexed by the Russian SFSR)

== Eastern periphery ==
  - Siberian regionalism
    - Siberian Republic
  - Buryat-Mongolia
  - Balagad state
  - Confederated Republic of Altai
    - "second" Confederated Republic of Altai
  - Yakutia
  - Green Ukraine
  - Tungus Republic
  - Far Eastern Republic (nominally independent 1920–1922; merged with the RSFSR)

== Caucasus ==
- Transcaucasia
- Azerbaijan (independence 1918–1920; invaded by the Russian SFSR and transformed into the Azerbaijan SSR)
  - Republic of Aras

Armenian–Azerbaijani War
Red Army invasion of Azerbaijan

- Armenia (independence 1918–1921; invaded by the Russian SFSR and transformed into the Armenian SSR)
  - Mountainous Armenia

Georgian–Armenian War
Armenian–Azerbaijani War
Turkish–Armenian War

- Georgia (independence 1918–1921; invaded by the Russian SFSR and transformed into the Georgian SSR)

Georgian–Ossetian conflict
Georgian–Armenian War
Sochi conflict
Red Army invasion of Georgia

- Republic of Batumi
- Kars Republic[Pro-Turkish]
- Caucasian Emirate
- Mughan
  - Mughan Soviet Republic
- Baku Commune
- Centrocaspian Dictatorship

Battle of Baku

- United Republics (independence 1917–1922; annexed by the Russian SFSR)

== Central Asia ==
- Basmachi
- Alash Autonomy
- Khiva
  - Khorezm People's Soviet Republic
- Emirate of Bukhara
  - Bukharan People's Soviet Republic
- Turkestan Autonomy
- Ukrainian national movement on Gray Klyn (1917-1921)
- Transcaspian Government
- Semirechye Cossacks

== See also ==
- List of states and regions involved in the Russian Civil War
- Bibliography of the Russian Revolution and Civil War
- Outline of the Russian Revolution and Civil War
