= Coat of arms of the Republic of Karelia =

Coat of arms of a Russian federal subject

Emblem of the Republic of Karelia
- Armiger: Artur Parfenchikov, Head of the Republic of Karelia
- Adopted: 25 October 1993
- Shield: Tierced per fess Gules, Azure and Vert. A bear rampant Sable langued and armed Gules.

The coat of arms of the Russian Republic of Karelia is crossed in three equal parts with the colors of the flag of Karelia on a shield with a profile of a rampant black bear. The golden frame of the shield comes into stylized image of a fir tree on the left and a pine tree on the right. In the upper part of the shield there is an octagonal star (doubled cross) of gold. The arms were created by Yuri Nivin.

The current coat of arms of Karelia has much resemblance with the coat of arms of the independent Republic of Uhtua, the national symbol of East Karelia created by Finnish artist Akseli Gallen-Kallela. The main difference is that the bear was holding a billhook. The shield had the traditional Varangian colours and there were polar lights above of shield.

== History ==
Emblem of the Karelian Autonomous Soviet Socialist Republic
- Armiger: Karelian Autonomous Soviet Socialist Republic
- Adopted: 17 June 1937
- Crest: Red star
- Supporters: Wheat and Cotton
- Motto: Kaikkien maiden proletaarit, liittykää yhteen! (Finnish) Пролетарии всех стран, соединяйтесь! (Russian) "Workers of the world, unite!"

The 11th Extraordinary Congress of the Soviets of Karelia on 16–17 June 1937 adopted the Constitution of the Karelian ASSR on 17 June 1937. The Chapter 10 of the Constitution contained the description of the symbols of the republic. The coat of arms of the Karelian ASSR was similar to the emblem of the Russian SFSR. The only difference is that the inscriptions were in Russian, Karelian, and Finnish.

=== First revision ===
At a meeting of the Presidium of the Central Executive Committee of the Karelian ASSR on 29 December 1937, it was decided to remove the Finnish language inscription in the emblem. This happened due to the reprisals against the Finns in the Karelian ASSR in the second half of 1937.

=== Promotion to SSR and re-demotion to ASSR ===
On 8 July 1940, the Karelian ASSR was re-organized as the Karelo-Finnish SSR. The SSR was given a new emblem.

On 16 July 1956, the Karelo-Finnish SSR was demoted into the Karelian ASSR.

=== Second revision ===
The coat of arms of the Karelian ASSR was described in the Article 111 of the Constitution of 1956, which was adopted on 20 August 1956, at the 4th session of the Supreme Soviet of the Karelian ASSR. The emblem was similar with the emblem of the Russian SFSR, but was supplemented with the motto in Finnish : Kaikkien maiden proletaarit, liittykää yhteen!

The Finnish language was restored as the official language as the Karelian ASSR, replacing the Karelian language.

=== Third revision ===
The 1978 Constitution of the Karelian ASSR confirmed the emblem and the flag of the republic on the article 157 and 158. Some changes were made to the inscriptions, with the name of the Karelian ASSR in Finnish was added.

Regulations on the emblem were adopted by the Presidium of the Supreme Soviet of the Karelian ASSR in 1981.

== Gallery ==
Olonets Government of Southern Karelia (1920)

Coat of arms Karelian United Government (1920–1923)

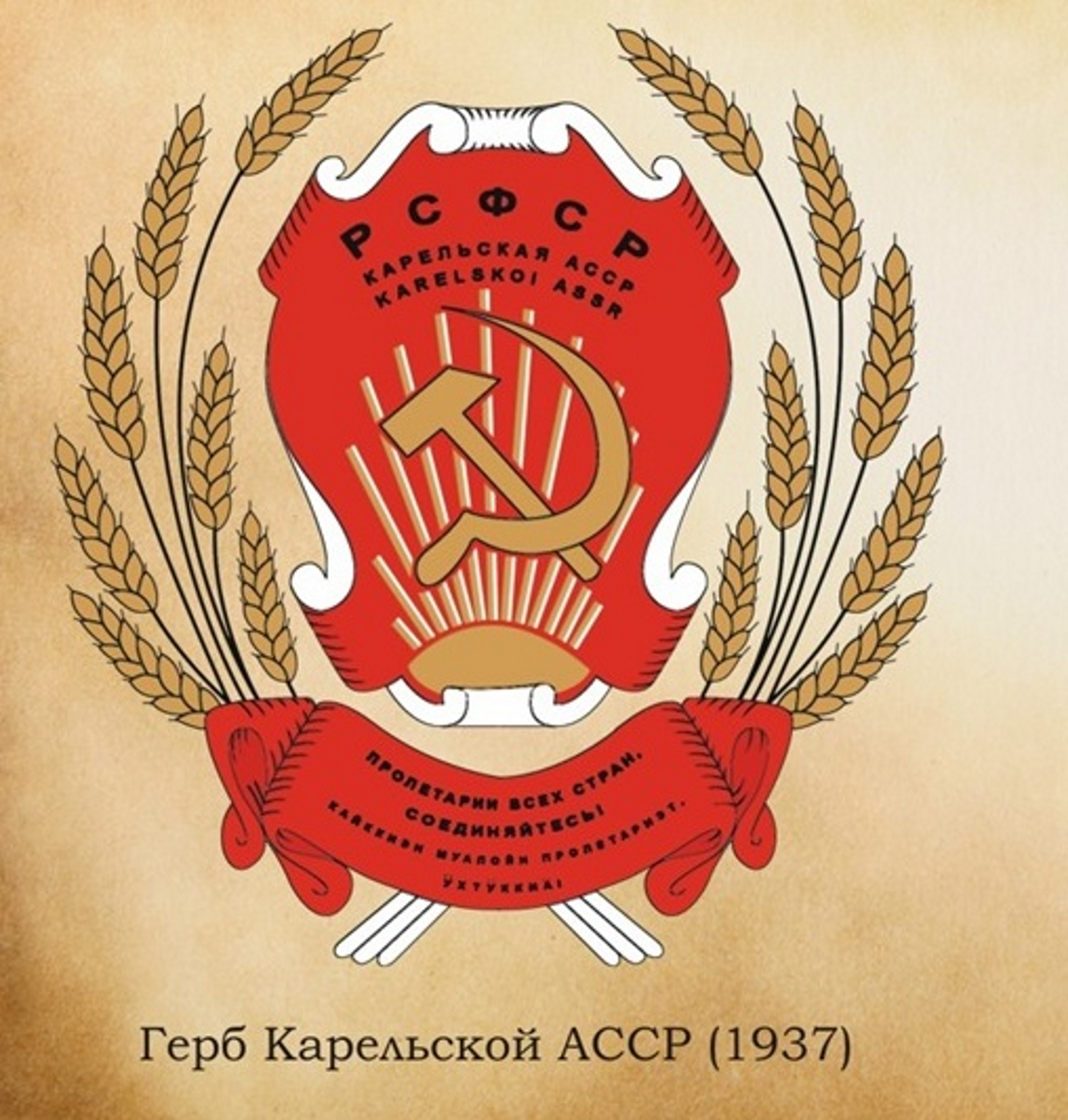
Emblem of the Karelian ASSR (1937–1940)

Emblem of the Karelo-Finnish SSR (1940–1956)

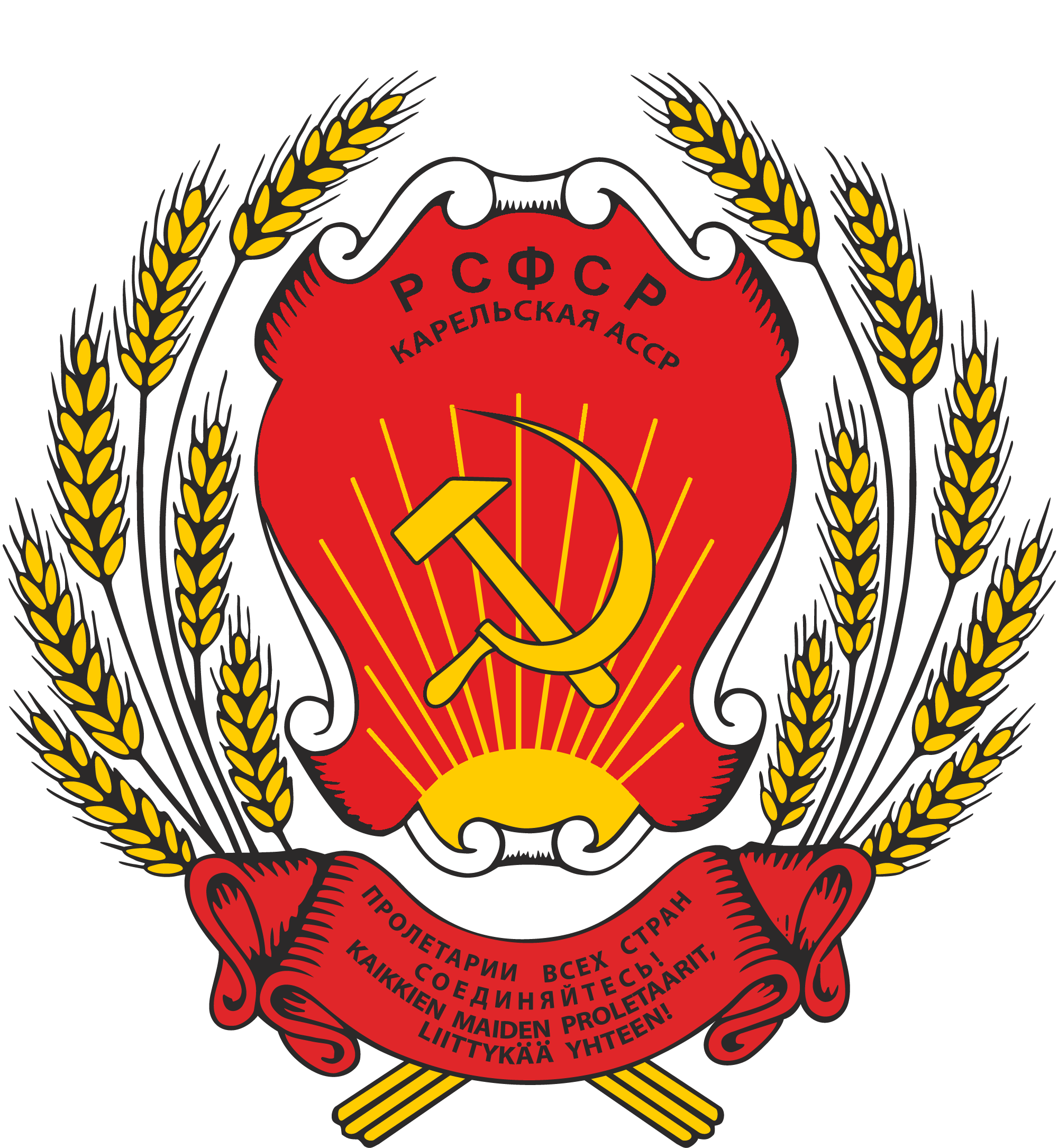
Emblem of the Karelian ASSR (1956–1978)

Emblem of the Karelian ASSR (1978–1991), the Karelian SSR (24 May–13 November 1991) and the Republic of Karelia (13 November 1991–25 October 1993)

Coat of arms of the Republic of Karelia (1993–)

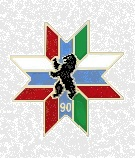
90th Anniversary of the Republic of Karelia (2010)

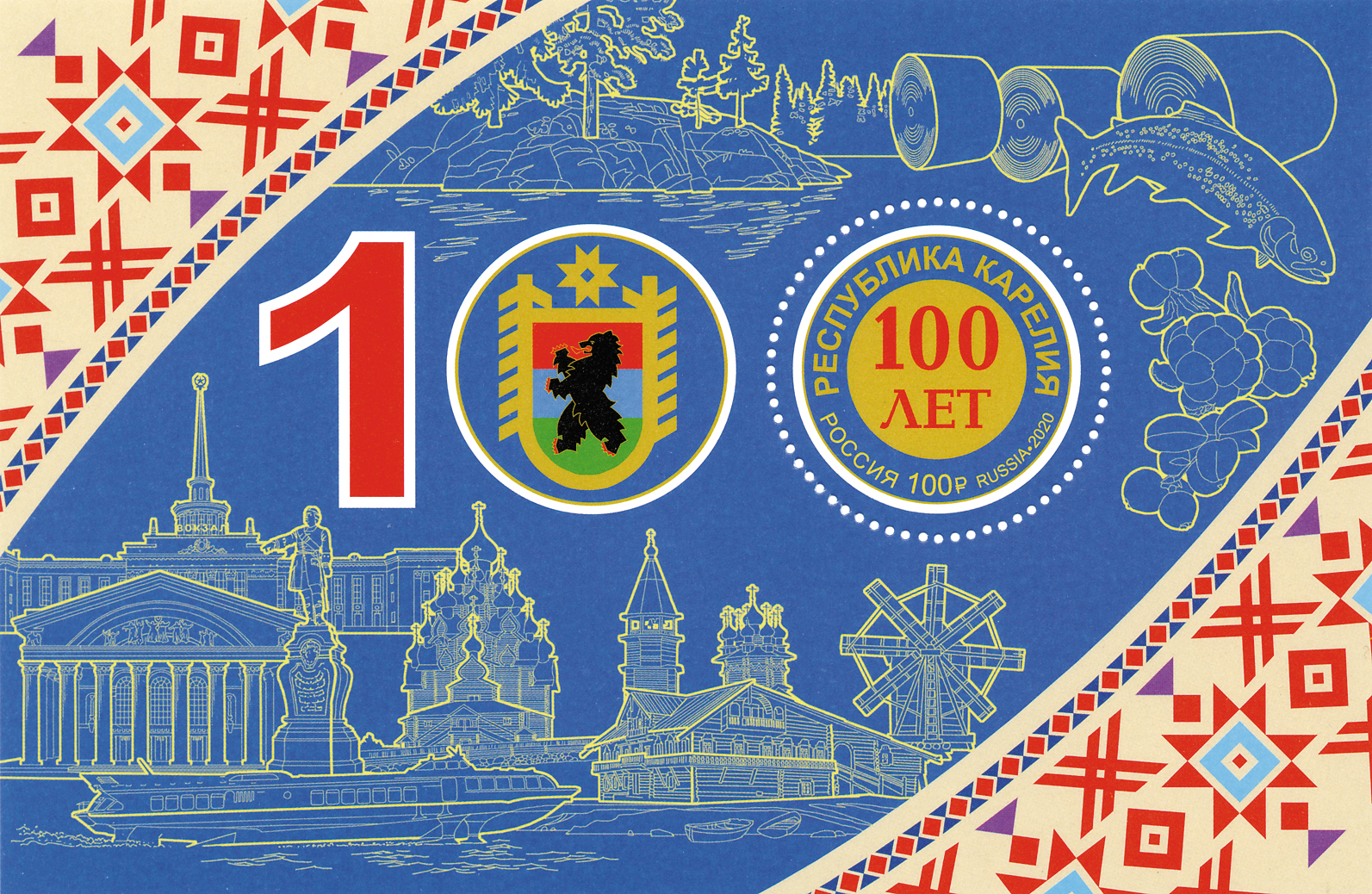
100th Anniversary of the Republic of Karelia (2020)

== Sources ==
- Constitution of the Republic of Karelia, paragraph 13.
- The official site of the republic

== See also ==
- Coat of arms of the Province of Karelia in Finland
- Emblem of the Karelo-Finnish Soviet Socialist Republic
- Coat of Arms of the Governorate of Finland
- Republic of Uhtua
- Kalevala, Russia
