= List of sovereign states in the 1920s =

Map of the World in 1925

This is a list of sovereign states in the 1920s, giving an overview of states around the world during the period between 1 January 1920 and 31 December 1929. It contains entries, arranged alphabetically, with information on the status and recognition of their sovereignty. It includes 90 widely recognized sovereign states, and entities which were de facto sovereign but which were not widely recognized by other states.

== Sovereign states ==
Name and capital city	Information on status and recognition of sovereignty
=== A ===
→ → → → → → → Afghanistan; Capital: Kabul: Emirate of Afghanistan (to 9 June 1926); Kingdom of Afghanistan (from 9 June 1926 to 17 January 1929); Emirate of Afghanistan (from 18 January 1929 to 13 October 1929); Kingdom of Afghanistan (from 15 October 1929)	Reign of Amanullah Khan, Inayatullah Khan, and Mohammed Nadir Shah: Widely-recognized independent state. Reign of Habibullāh Kalakāni, Ali Ahmad Khan and Abd-al Karim: Not recognized by any state.
→ → → Albania; Capital: Tirana: Principality of Albania (to January 31, 1925); Albanian Republic (from January 31, 1925 to September 1, 1928); Albanian Kingdom (from September 1, 1928)	Widely-recognized independent state. De facto Italian protectorate to August 2, 1920. LON member state from December 17, 1920.
Andorra – Principality of Andorra; Capital: Andorra La Vella	Widely-recognized independent state.
Argentina – Argentine Republic; Capital: Buenos Aires	Widely-recognized independent state. LON founding member state from January 10, 1920.
→ Armenia (to March 12, 1922); Capital: Yerevan: Republic of Armenia (to November 29, 1920); Armenian Socialist Soviet Republic (from November 29, 1920 to March 12, 1922)	Widely-recognized independent state until November 29, 1920. Became part of the Transcaucasian SFSR from March 12, 1922.
Asir – Idrisid Emirate of Asir (to October 21, 1926); Capital: Sabya	Widely-recognized independent state. Vassal state of Kingdom of Hejaz and Nejd from October 21, 1926.
Asir, Upper – Sheikdom of Upper Asir (to August 30, 1920); Capital: Abha	Widely-recognized independent state. Partitioned between Sultanate of Nejd and Idrisid Emirate of Asir from August 30, 1920.
Aussa – Sultanate of Aussa; Capital: Aussa	Widely recognized state.
Australia – Commonwealth of Australia; Capital: Melbourne (to 9 May, 1927), Canberra (from May 9, 1927)	Widely recognized state dependent on the United Kingdom. De facto independent from November 15, 1926. LON founding member state from 10 January. British dominion and member of the Commonwealth realm. Australia was a federation of six states and four territories. (Note: 6 States: New South Wales, Queensland, South Australia, Tasmania, Victoria, Western Australia. 4 internal territories: Australian Capital Territory, Central Australia (from February 1, 1927), Jervis Bay Territory, Northern Territory.) Australia had two external territories: Norfolk Island; Papua; Australia administered two League of Nations mandates: Nauru (Administered by Australia, New Zealand and the United Kingdom from December 17, 1920); → New Guinea (Administered from December 17, 1920)
Austria – Republic of Austria; Capital: Vienna	Widely-recognized independent state and a LON member state from December 15, 1920.
→ → Azerbaijan (to March 12, 1922); Capital: Baku: Azerbaijan Democratic Republic (to April 28, 1920); Azerbaijan Socialist Soviet Republic (from April 28, 1920 to March 12, 1922)	Widely-recognized independent state. Became part of the Transcaucasian SFSR from March 12, 1922. Azerbaijan had one protectorate: Nakhichevan ASSR (Protectorate from March 16, 1921)
=== B ===
Belgium – Kingdom of Belgium; Capital: Brussels	Widely-recognized independent state. LON founding member state from January 10, 1920. Belgium had sovereignty over one colony and one concession: Belgian Congo (Colony); Tientsin (Concession); Belgium administered one League of Nations mandate: Ruanda-Urundi (LON mandate from July 20, 1922. Administrative union with the Belgian Congo from March 1, 1926)
Bolivia; Capital: Sucre: Republic of Bolivia (to July 12, 1920); Republic of Bolivia (from July 12, 1920)	Widely-recognized independent state. LON founding member state from January 10, 1920.
Brazil – Republic of the United States of Brazil; Capital: Rio de Janeiro	Widely-recognized independent state. LON founding member state from January 10, 1920; withdrew on June 14, 1926. Brazil was a federation of 20 states, one territory, and one federal district. (Note: 20 States: Alagoas, Amazonas, Bahia, Ceará, Espírito Santo, Goiás, Maranhão, Mato Grosso, Minas Gerais, Pará, Paraíba, Paraná, Pernambuco, Piauí, Rio Grande do Norte, Rio Grande do Sul, Rio de Janeiro, Santa Catarina, São Paulo, Sergipe. 1 Territory: Acre. 1 Federal District: Federal District.)
Bulgaria – Tsardom of Bulgaria; Capital: Sofia	Widely-recognized independent state. LON member state from December 16, 1920.
=== C ===
(Canada) → Canada – Dominion of Canada; Capital: Ottawa	Widely-recognized state dependent on the United Kingdom. De facto independent from November 15, 1926. LON founding member state from January 10, 1920. British dominion and member of the Commonwealth realm.
Chile – Republic of Chile; Capital: Santiago	Widely-recognized independent state. LON founding member state from January 10, 1920.
→ China – Republic of China Capital: Beijing, Nanjing	Widely-recognized independent state. LON founding member state from January 10, 1920.
Colombia – Republic of Colombia; Capital: Bogotá	Widely-recognized independent state. LON founding member state from January 10, 1920.
Costa Rica – Republic of Costa Rica; Capital: San José	Widely-recognized independent state. LON member state from December 16, 1920; withdrew on January 22, 1925.
Cuba – Republic of Cuba; Capital: Havana	Widely-recognized independent state. LON founding member state from January 10, 1920.
→ Czechoslovakia; Capital: Prague: Czecho-Slovak Republic (to 1920); Czechoslovak Republic (from 1920)	Widely-recognized independent state. LON founding member state from January 10, 1920.
=== D ===
Danzig – Free City of Danzig (from November 15, 1920); Capital: Danzig	Widely-recognized independent. Under League of Nations protection.
Dar Masalit – Sultanate of Dar Masalit (to 1922); Capital: El Geneina	Widely recognized independent state to 1922. Incorporated into Anglo-Egyptian Sudan in 1922.
Denmark – Kingdom of Denmark; Capital: Copenhagen	Widely-recognized independent state. LON founding member state from January 10, 1920.
Dominican Republic – Third Dominican Republic; Capital: Santo Domingo	Widely-recognized independent state under United States military occupation to 18 September 1924. LON member state from September 28, 1924.
=== E ===
Ecuador; Capital: Quito: Republic of Ecuador (to 9 July 1925); Republic of Ecuador (from 9 July 1925)	Widely-recognized independent state.
Egypt – Kingdom of Egypt (from February 28, 1922); Capital: Cairo	Widely-recognized independent state.
El Salvador – Republic of El Salvador; Capital: San Salvador	Widely-recognized independent state. LON founding member state from January 10, 1920.
Estonia – Republic of Estonia; Capital: Tallinn	Widely-recognized independent state. LON member state from September 22, 1921.
Ethiopia – Ethiopian Empire; Capital: Addis Ababa	Widely-recognized independent state. LON member state from September 28, 1923.
=== F ===
Finland – Republic of Finland; Capital: Helsinki	Widely-recognized independent state. LON member state from December 16, 1920.
Fiume – Free State of Fiume (from November 12, 1920 to February 22, 1924); Capital: Fiume	Widely-recognized independent. Annexed by Italy from February 22, 1924.
France – French Republic; Capital: Paris	Widely-recognized independent state. LON founding member state from January 10, 1920. France administered the foreign affairs of the following protectorates: French Algeria (de jure Department of Metropolitan France, de facto Colony); French Equatorial Africa (Colony); French Guiana (Colony); French India – French Establishments in India (Colony); French Indochina (Federation of protectorates); French Madagascar (Colony); French Morocco (Protectorate); French Oceania – French Establishments in Oceania (Colony); French Somaliland (Colony); French Tunisia (Protectorate); French West Africa (Colony); Guadeloupe (Colony); Martinique (Colony); France administered the following League of Nations mandates: Alawite (Note: Part of the Syrian Federation from June 28, 1922 to January 1, 1925.) (LON mandate from September 2, 1920. Administered by France from September 29, 1923.); Greater Lebanon (Note: Renamed Lebanese Republic from May 23, 1926.) (LON mandate from September 1, 1920. Administered by France from September 29, 1923); Syrian Federation (Note: Syrian Federation was a federation constituted by the States of Aleppo (LON mandate from September 1, 1920), Damascus (LON mandate from July 25, 1920) and of the Alawites (LON mandate from September 1, 1920).) (LON mandate from June 28, 1922 to January 1, 1925. Administered by France from September 29, 1923); State of Syria (Note: The states of Aleppo and Damascus were united into the State of Syria.) (LON mandate from January 1, 1925); → Souaida (Note: Part of State of Damascus from July 25, 1920 to May 1, 1921. Renamed Jabal ad-Druze from June 1, 1927.) (LON mandate from July 25, 1920. Administered by France from September 29, 1923); French Cameroons (LON mandate from July 20, 1922); French Togoland (LON mandate from July 20, 1922); Saar Basin (Administered by the United Kingdom and France from January 10, 1920)
=== G ===
(Georgia (country)) → (Georgian Soviet Socialist Republic) → (Georgian Soviet Socialist Republic) Georgia (to March 12, 1922); Capital: Tiflis: Democratic Republic of Georgia (to February 11, 1921); Georgian Soviet Socialist Republic (from February 11, 1921 to March 12, 1922)	Widely-recognized independent state. Georgian SSR had one autonomous republic (from July 16, 1921): Adjarian ASSR. Became part of the Transcaucasian SFSR from March 12, 1922.: SSR Abkhazia (Associated state from December 16, 1921) (Note: Abkhazia signed a treaty of alliance with the Georgian SSR, which defined its status as a "treaty republic" (Russian: договорная республика) and established a military, political and financial union between the two Soviet republics, subordinating the Abkhazia to the Georgia.)
Germany – German Realm; Capital: Berlin	Widely-recognized independent state. LON member state from September 8, 1926.
→ Greece; Capital: Athens: Kingdom of Greece (to March 25, 1924); Hellenic Republic (from March 25, 1924)	Widely-recognized independent state. LON founding member state from January 10, 1920.
Guatemala – Republic of Guatemala; Capital: Guatemala City	Widely-recognized independent state. LON founding member state from January 10, 1920.
=== H ===
→ Ha'il / Jabal Shammar – Emirate of Ha'il (to November 2, 1921); Capital: Ha'il	Widely-recognized independent state. It was completely conquered by Saudi forces from November 2, 1921 and subsequently incorporated into the Sultanate of Nejd.
Haiti – Republic of Haiti; Capital: Port-au-Prince	Widely-recognized independent state under United States occupation. LON founding member state from January 10, 1920.
→ Hejaz – Hashemite Kingdom of Hejaz (to January 8, 1926); Capital: Mecca	Widely-recognized independent state. Annexed by Sultanate of Nejd, creating the Kingdom of Hejaz and Nejd from January 8, 1926.
Hejaz and Nejd – Kingdom of Hejaz and Nejd (Personal Union, from January 8, 1926) Capital: Mecca (Hejaz), Riyadh (Nejd): Kingdom of Hejaz and Sultanate of Nejd (from January 8, 1926 to January 29, 1927); Kingdom of Hejaz and Nejd (from January 29, 1927)	Widely-recognized independent state. Nejd and Hejaz had one protectorate: Asir (from October 21, 1926)
Honduras – Republic of Honduras; Capital: Tegucigalpa	Widely-recognized independent state. LON founding member state from January 10, 1920.
→ Hungary; Capital: Budapest: Hungarian Republic (to February 29, 1920); Kingdom of Hungary (from March 1, 1920)	Widely-recognized independent state. LON member state from September 18, 1922.
=== I ===
Italy – Kingdom of Italy; Capital: Rome	Widely-recognized independent state under fascism from 31 October 1922. LON founding member state from January 10, 1920. Italy had four colonies and three concessions: (Kingdom of Italy) Amoy (Concession); Italian Cyrenaica (Colony); (Kingdom of Italy) Italian Eritrea (Colony); (Kingdom of Italy) Italian Somaliland (Colony); Italian Tripolitania (Colony); (Kingdom of Italy) Shanghai (Concession); (Kingdom of Italy) Tientsin (Concession); (Kingdom of Italy) Trans-Juba (Colony from 15 July 1924 to 10 June 1926)
Ireland – Irish Free State (from December 6, 1922); Capital: Dublin	Widely-recognized state dependent of the United Kingdom from December 6, 1922. De facto independent from November 15, 1926. LON member state from September 10, 1923. British dominion from December 6, 1922 and member of the Commonwealth realm.
=== J ===
Japan – Empire of Japan; Capital: Tokyo	Widely-recognized independent state. LON founding member state from January 10, 1920. Japan had sovereignty over the following dependencies and concessions: (Empire of Japan) Chongqing (Concession); (Empire of Japan) Hangzhou (Concession); (Empire of Japan) Hankou (Concession); (Empire of Japan) Japanese Korea (Chōsen) (Note: Claimed by Provisional Government of the Republic of Korea (partially recognized government-in-exile).) (Dependency); (Empire of Japan) Karafuto (Dependency); (Empire of Japan) Kwantung (Concession); (Empire of Japan) Shashi (Concession); (Empire of Japan) Suzhou (Concession); (Empire of Japan) Taiwan (Dependency); (Empire of Japan) Tientsin (Concession); Japan administered one League of Nations mandate: South Seas Mandate
=== L ===
& Latvia (disputed between two governments to January 13, 1920); Capital: Riga: Republic of Latvia; Latvian Socialist Soviet Republic (to January 13, 1920)	Widely-recognized independent state. LON member state from September 22, 1921.
Liberia – Republic of Liberia; Capital: Monrovia	Widely-recognized independent state. LON founding member state from January 10, 1920.
→ Liechtenstein – Principality of Liechtenstein; Capital: Vaduz	Widely-recognized independent state.
Lithuania – Republic of Lithuania; Capital: Vilnius	Widely-recognized independent state. LON member state from September 22, 1921.
Luxembourg – Grand Duchy of Luxembourg; Capital: Luxembourg City	Widely-recognized independent state. LON member state from December 16, 1920.
=== M ===
Mexico – United Mexican States; Capital: Mexico City	Widely-recognized independent state. Mexico had sovereignty over one territory: Isla de la Pasión (uninhabited territory)
Monaco – Principality of Monaco; Capital: Monaco City	Widely-recognized independent state.
Muscat and Oman – Sultanate of Muscat and Oman; Capital: Muscat	De jure independent state. De facto a British protectorate.
=== N ===
Najran – Principality of Najran; Capital: Najran	Widely recognized independent state.
→ Nejd (to January 8, 1926); Capital: Riyadh: Emirate of Nejd and Hasa (to August 22, 1921); Sultanate of Nejd (from August 22, 1921 to January 8, 1926)	Widely-recognized independent state. Nejd annexed Hejaz, creating the Kingdom of Hejaz and Nejd from January 8, 1926.
Nepal – Kingdom of Nepal (from December 21, 1923); Capital: Kathmandu	Widely-recognized independent state.
Netherlands – Kingdom of the Netherlands; Capital: Amsterdam	Widely-recognized independent state. LON founding member state from January 10, 1920. The Netherlands had sovereignty over three colonies: Curaçao and Dependencies; Dutch East Indies; Surinam
Newfoundland – Dominion of Newfoundland; Capital: St. John's	Widely-recognized state dependent on the United Kingdom. De facto independent from November 15, 1926. British dominion and member of the Commonwealth realm.
New Zealand – Dominion of New Zealand; Capital: Wellington	Widely-recognized state dependent on the United Kingdom. De facto independent from November 15, 1926. LON founding member state January 10, 1920. British dominion and member of the Commonwealth realm. The following are territories of New Zealand: (New Zealand) Cook Islands (Dependent territory); (New Zealand) Niue Island (Dependent territory); (New Zealand) Ross Dependency (Uninhabited dependent territory from November 14, 1923); (New Zealand) Union Islands (Dependent territory from February 11, 1926); New Zealand administered one League of Nations mandate: Western Samoa (LON mandate from December 17, 1920)
Nicaragua – Republic of Nicaragua; Capital: Managua	Widely-recognized independent state. LON founding member state from January 10, 1920.
Norway – Kingdom of Norway; Capital: Oslo	Widely-recognized independent state. LON founding member state from January 10, 1920. Norway had sovereignty over two uninhabited possessions: Bouvet Island (from January 23, 1928); Sverdrup Islands
=== O ===
Ottoman Empire – Sublime Ottoman State (to November 1, 1922); Capital: Constantinople	Widely-recognized independent state. Ottoman Empire had one protectorate: North Caucasian Emirate (to March 1920)
=== P ===
Panama – Republic of Panama; Capital: Panama City	Widely-recognized independent state.
Paraguay – Republic of Paraguay; Capital: Asunción	Widely-recognized independent state. LON founding member state from January 10, 1920.
→ Persia; Capital: Tehran: Persian Empire (to October 31, 1925); Imperial State of Persia (from October 31, 1925)	Widely-recognized independent state. LON founding member state from January 10, 1920.
Peru – Peruvian Republic; Capital: Lima	Widely-recognized independent state. LON founding member state from January 10, 1920.
→ Poland – Republic of Poland; Capital: Warsaw	Widely-recognized independent state. LON founding member state from January 10, 1920.
Portugal; Capital: Lisbon: First Portuguese Republic (to 29 May 1926); Ditadura Nacional (from 29 May 1926)	Widely-recognized independent state. LON founding member state from January 10, 1920. The following are colonies and possession of Portugal: Portuguese Cape Verde (Colony); Portuguese Macau (Colony); Portuguese East Africa (Colony); Portuguese Guinea (Colony); Portuguese India (Colony); Portuguese Timor (Colony); Portuguese West Africa (Colony); Fort of São João Baptista de Ajudá (Possession); Portuguese São Tomé and Príncipe (Colony)
=== R ===
Romania – Kingdom of Romania; Capital: Bucharest	Widely-recognized independent state. LON founding member state from January 10, 1920.
Russia – Russian Socialist Federative Soviet Republic (to December 30, 1922); Capital: Moscow	Widely-recognized independent state. Became part of the Soviet Union from December 30, 1922. Russia had three protectorates and one concession: Bukhara (Protectorate to October 8, 1920); Khiva (Protectorate to February 2, 1920); Uryankhay (Protectorate to August 14, 1921); (Russian Soviet Federative Socialist Republic) Tientsin (De facto concession to September 15, 1920)
=== S ===
San Marino – Most Serene Republic of San Marino; Capital: City of San Marino	Widely-recognized independent state.
Siam – Kingdom of Siam; Capital: Bangkok	Widely-recognized independent state. LON founding member state from January 10, 1920.
→ South Africa – Union of South Africa Capital: Cape Town, Pretoria, Bloemfontein, and Pietermaritzburg	Widely-recognized state dependent on the United Kingdom. De facto independent from November 15, 1926. LON founding member state January 10, 1920. British dominion and member of the Commonwealth realm. South Africa administered one League of Nations mandate: → South West Africa (LON mandate from October 1, 1922, South African possession prior)
→ → Soviet Union – Union of Soviet Socialist Republics (from December 30, 1922); Capital: Moscow	Widely-recognized independent state. The Soviet Union was a federation of four (later seven) republics. (Note: Byelorussian SSR (from December 30, 1922), Russian SFSR (from December 30, 1922), Transcaucasian SFSR (from December 30, 1922), Ukrainian SSR (from December 30, 1922), Uzbek SSR (from December 5, 1924), Turkmen SSR (from May 13, 1925), Tajik SSR (from December 5, 1929).)
Spain – Kingdom of Spain; Capital: Madrid	Widely-recognized independent state. LON founding member state from January 10, 1920. Spain had sovereignty over the following colonies, possessions and protectorate: (Spain) Elobey, Annobón and Corisco (Colony to 1926); (Spain) Fernando Poo (Colony to 1926); (Spain) Río Muni (Colony to 1926); Spanish Guinea (Colony from 1926); (Spain) Spanish North Africa (Possession until 1925); Spanish Sahara (Colony); Spanish Morocco (Protectorate)
Sweden – Kingdom of Sweden; Capital: Stockholm	Widely-recognized independent state. LON founding member state from January 10, 1920.
Switzerland – Swiss Confederation; Capital: Bern	Widely-recognized independent state. LON founding member state from January 10, 1920.
=== T ===
(Ottoman Empire) Turkey (from April 23, 1920); Capital: Ankara: State of Turkey (from April 23, 1920 to July 24, 1923); Turkey (from July 24, 1923 to October 29, 1923); Republic of Turkey (from October 29, 1923)	Widely-recognized independent state.
=== U ===
United Kingdom; Capital: London: United Kingdom of Great Britain and Ireland (to April 12, 1927); United Kingdom of Great Britain and Northern Ireland (from April 12, 1927)	Widely-recognized independent state. LON founding member state from January 10, 1920. The United Kingdom was made up of six constituent countries. (Note: Constituent countries: England, Ireland (until May 3 1921), Northern Ireland (from May 3 1921), Scotland, Southern Ireland (May 3 1921 until December 6 1922), and Wales.) The United Kingdom had six autonomous dominions which became de facto independent on November 15, 1926: Australia (Note: League of Nations founding member, January 10, 1920) including territories: Norfolk Island (External territory); Territory of Papua; → New Guinea (LON mandate, from December 17, 1920); Nauru (from December 17, 1920) (Note: administered with New Zealand and the UK as co-trustees); Dominion of Canada (Note: League of Nations founding member, January 10, 1920); Ireland (Note: League of Nations member from September 10, 1923) (from December 6, 1922); Dominion of Newfoundland; New Zealand (Note: League of Nations founding member, January 10, 1920) including territories: Western Samoa (LON mandate from December 17, 1920); Cook Islands (dependent territory); Niue-Fekai (dependent territory); Union Islands (dependent territory); Ross Dependency (Uninhabited dependent territory, from November 13 1923); → South Africa (Note: League of Nations founding member, January 10, 1920) including one territory: → South West Africa (LON mandate from October 1 1922, South African possession prior); The following were colonies, concessions, and territories of the United Kingdom: (United Kingdom) Aden (Protectorate); (United Kingdom) Amoy (Concession); Anglo-Egyptian Sudan (Condominium of the United Kingdom and the Sultanate/Kingdom of Egypt); (United Kingdom) Ascension Island (Uninhabited possession, until 20 October 1922); Ashanti (Protectorate); → Bahama Islands (Crown colony); Bahrain – State of Bahrain (Protectorate); Baker Island (Uninhabited possession); Barbados (Crown colony); Basutoland – Territory of Basutoland (Crown colony); Bechuanaland – Bechuanaland Protectorate (Protectorate); Bermuda (Crown colony); Bhutan – Kingdom of Bhutan (Independent state under Treaty of Punakha); British East Africa (Protectorate to July 23, 1920); British Guiana (Crown colony); British Honduras (Crown colony); British Leeward Islands – Federal Colony of the Leeward Islands (Crown colony); British Somaliland – British Somaliland Protectorate (Protectorate); British Windward Islands – Federal Colony of the Windward Islands (Crown colony); Brunei – State of Brunei (Protectorate); Ceylon (Crown colony); (United Kingdom) Chinde (Concession until 1923); → Cyprus (Crown colony); Egypt (Protectorate to February 28, 1922); → Falkland Islands (Crown colony); Federated Malay States (Protectorate); Gambia – Gambia Colony and Protectorate (Crown colony and protectorate); → Gibraltar (Crown colony); Gold Coast (Crown colony); (United Kingdom) Hankou (Concession until 1927); Heard Island and McDonald Islands (Uninhabited possession); Hong Kong (Crown colony); British India (Crown colony. LON founding member state from January 10, 1920.); Jamaica (Crown colony); Kenya (Crown colony from June 11, 1920 and protectorate from August 13, 1920); Jarvis Island (Uninhabited possession); (United Kingdom) Jiujiang (Concession until 1929); Kuwait – Sheikhdom of Kuwait (Protectorate); → Maldive Islands – Sultanate of the Maldive Islands (Protectorate); → Malta (Crown colony); → Mauritius (Crown colony); Nepal (Protectorate to December 21, 1923); Nigeria – Colony and Protectorate of Nigeria (Crown colony and protectorate); North Borneo (Protectorate); → Northern Rhodesia – Protectorate of Northern Rhodesia (Protectorate); Northern Territories of the Gold Coast (Protectorate); → Nyasaland – Nyasaland Protectorate (Protectorate); Qatar – State of Qatar (Protectorate); (United Kingdom) Redonda (Possession); Saint Helena (Crown colony); Sarawak – Kingdom of Sarawak (Protectorate); Seychelles (Crown colony); Sierra Leone – Sierra Leone Colony and Protectorate (Crown colony and protectorate); Sikkim (Independent state under the Treaty of Tumlong); (United Kingdom) South Orkney Islands (Uninhabited possession); → Southern Rhodesia – Colony of Southern Rhodesia (Crown colony from 12 September 1923); (United Kingdom) South Shetland Islands (Uninhabited possession); → Straits Settlements (Crown colony); (United Kingdom) Suez Canal Zone Crown colony; Swaziland – Swaziland Protectorate (Protectorate); Transjordan (Protectorate from April 11, 1921 to September 29, 1923); Trinidad and Tobago (Crown colony); Tristan da Cunha (Crown colony); Trucial States (Protectorate); Uganda (Protectorate); Unfederated Malay States; Johor (Protectorate); Kedah (Protectorate); → Kelantan (Protectorate); Perlis (Protectorate); Terengganu (Protectorate); (United Kingdom) Tientsin (Concession); (United Kingdom) Union Islands (Colony to February 11, 1926); Victoria Land (Uninhabited possession); Weihaiwei (Concession); Zanzibar (Protectorate); (United Kingdom) Zhenjiang (Concession until 1929); United Kingdom administered the following League of Nations mandates: British Cameroons (LON mandate from July 20, 1922); British Togoland (LON mandate from July 20, 1922); → Iraq (LON mandate from August 23, 1921); Palestine (LON mandate from April 25, 1920. Administered by the United Kingdom from September 29, 1923); → Transjordan (Administered under the Mandate for Palestine by the United Kingdom from September 29, 1923); Saar Basin (Administered by the United Kingdom and France from January 10, 1920); → Tanganyika (LON mandate from July 20, 1922); The British Crown (but not the UK) had sovereignty over the following crown dependencies: Guernsey – Bailiwick of Guernsey, with two dependecies: Alderney; Sark; Jersey – Bailiwick of Jersey; (United Kingdom) Isle of Man
United States – United States of America; Capital: Washington, D.C.	Widely-recognized independent state. The following were territories of the United States of America: → Alaska (Territory); American Samoa (Territory); Corn Islands (Territory); Guam (Territory); Hawaii (Territory); Howland Island (Uninhabited territory); Johnston Atoll (Uninhabited territory); Kingman Reef (Uninhabited territory); Midway Atoll (Uninhabited territory); Navassa Island (Uninhabited territory); Panama Canal Zone (Territory); Petrel Islands (Uninhabited territory); Philippine Islands (Territory); Puerto Rico (Territory); Quita Sueno Bank (Uninhabited territory); Roncador Bank (Uninhabited territory); Serrana Bank (Uninhabited territory); Serranilla Bank (Uninhabited territory); Swan Islands (Uninhabited territory); → United States Virgin Islands (Territory)
Uruguay – Eastern Republic of Uruguay; Capital: Montevideo	Widely-recognized independent state. LON founding member state from January 10, 1920.
=== V ===
Vatican City – Vatican City State (from February 1, 1929; effective from June 7, 1929); Capital: Vatican City	Widely recognized independent state. Vatican City is administered by the Holy See.
Venezuela – United States of Venezuela; Capital: Caracas	Widely-recognized independent state. LON founding member state from January 10, 1920.
=== Y ===
Yemen – Mutawakkilite Kingdom of Yemen; Capital: Sana`a	Widely-recognized independent state.
Yugoslavia / Serbs, Croats and Slovenes; Capital: Belgrade: Kingdom of Serbs, Croats and Slovenes (to January 6, 1929); Kingdom of Yugoslavia (from January 6, 1929)	Widely-recognized independent state; LON founding member state from January 10, 1920.
== States with limited independence, sovereignty or recognition == Excluded from the list above are the following noteworthy entities which either were not fully sovereign or did not claim to be independent:
Abkhazia – Socialist Soviet Republic of Abkhazia (from March 31, 1921 to December 16, 1921); Capital: Sukhumi	Partially recognized independent state until March 31, 1921. It was subordinate to the Georgian SSR from December 16, 1921.
Alash – Alash Autonomy (to August 26, 1920); Capital: Alash-Qala	Unrecognized state.
Ararat – Republic of Ararat (from October 28, 1927); Capital: Kurdava	Unrecognized state.
Armenia, Mountainous – Republic of Mountainous Armenia (from April 26, 1920 to July 13, 1921); Capital: Tabriz	Unrecognized state.
Azadistan (from April to September 13, 1920); Capital: Goris	Unrecognized state.
Baranya–Baja – Serbian–Hungarian Baranya–Baja Republic (from 14 to 25 August 1921); Capital: Pécs	Unrecognized state.
Bottleneck – Free State of Bottleneck (to February 23, 1923); Capital: Lorch	Quasi-state. Unoccupied territory within post-World War I Germany.
Bukhara (from October 8, 1920 to October 27, 1924); Capital: Bukhara: Bukharan People's Soviet Republic (from October 8, 1920 to September 19, 1924); Bukharan Socialist Soviet Republic (from September 19 to October 27, 1924)	Soviet state.
(Byelorussian Soviet Socialist Republic) Byelorussia – Byelorussian Socialist Soviet Republic (from July 31, 1920 to December 30, 1922); Capital: Minsk	Soviet state. Became part of the Soviet Union from December 30, 1922.
Carnaro – Italian Regency of Carnaro (from September 8 to December 30, 1920); Capital: Fiume	Unrecognized state.
Central Lithuania – Republic of Central Lithuania (from October 12, 1920); Capital: Vilnius	Puppet state of the Second Polish Republic.
Don – Don Republic (to 1920); Capital: Novocherkassk	Unrecognized state.
Far Eastern Republic (from April 6, 1920 to November 15, 1922); Capital: Verkhneudinsk (to October 1920), Chita (from October 1920)	Puppet state/Buffer state of Soviet Russia.
Galicia – Galician Socialist Soviet Republic (from July 8 to September 21, 1920); Capital: Ternopil	Unrecognized state.
Gilan – Persian Socialist Soviet Republic (from June 1920 to September 1921); Capital: Rasht	Unrecognized state.
Iceland – Kingdom of Iceland; Capital: Reykjavík	Nominally recognized associated state in personal union with Denmark.
Ireland – Irish Republic (to December 6, 1922); Capital: Dublin	Unrecognized state.
Karelia: Karelian United Government (from December 20, 1920 to April 21, 1921); Republic of Eastern Karelia (from April 21, 1921 to July 23, 1923)	Unrecognized state.
Kholodny Yar – Kholodny Yar Republic (to 1922); Capital: Melnyky, Cherkasy Raion	Unrecognized state.
Khorasan – Autonomous Government of Khorasan (from April 2, 1921 to October 6, 1921); Capital: Mashhad	Unrecognized state.
Khorezm (from April 26, 1920 to October 27, 1924); Capital: Khiva: Khorezm People's Soviet Republic (from April 26, 1920 to October 20, 1923); Khorezm Socialist Soviet Republic (from October 20, 1923 to October 27, 1924)	Soviet state.
Korea, Provisional Government of – Provisional Government of the Republic of Korea; Capital-in-exile: Shanghai	Partially recognized Korean government-in-exile.
Kuban – Kuban People's Republic (to March 17, 1920); Capital: Yekaterinodar	Unrecognized state.
Kurdistan – Kingdom of Kurdistan (from September 1921 to July 1925); Capital: Sulaymaniyah	Unrecognized state.
Labin – Labin Republic (from March 2 to April 8, 1921); Capital: Labin	Unrecognized state.
Leitha – Banate of Leitha (from October 4 to November 10, 1921); Capital: Oberwart	Unrecognized state.
Lemko Republic – Lemko-Rusyn People's Republic (to March 1920); Capital: Florynka	Unrecognized state.
Mirdita – Republic of Mirdita (from July 17 to November 20, 1921); Capital: Prizren	Unrecognized state.
→ → Mongolia (from February 21, 1921); Capital: Niislel Khüree (renamed Ulaanbaatar in 1924): Bogd Khanate of Mongolia (from February 21 to July 11, 1921); Mongolian People's Government (from July 11, 1921 to November 26, 1924); Mongolian People's Republic (from November 26, 1924)	Partially recognized socialist republic. Under Soviet intervention from 1921 to 1924. Satellite state of the Soviet Union from November 26, 1924.
North Ingria – Republic of North Ingria (to December 5, 1920); Capital: Kirjasalo	Unrecognized state.
North Caucasian Emirate (to March, 1920); Capital: Temir-Khan-Shura	Ottoman protectorate, incorporated into Mountain Autonomous Soviet Socialist Republic.
Raqqa – Independent State of Raqqa (from August 10, 1920 to December 17, 1921); Capital: Raqqa	Unrecognized state.
Rhineland – Rhenish Republic (from October 21, 1923 to November 26, 1924); Capital: Aachen	Unrecognized state.
Rif – Confederal Republic of the Tribes of the Rif (from September 18, 1921 to May 27, 1926); Capital: Ajdir	Unrecognized state.
Southern Karelia – Olonets Government of Southern Karelia (from May to December 20, 1920)	Unrecognized state.
Syria – Arab Kingdom of Syria (to July 25, 1920); Capital: Damascus	De facto independent state not recognized by any other state.
→ Tannu Tuva (from August 14, 1921); Capital: Khem-Beldyr: People's Republic of Tannu Tuva (from August 14, 1921 to November 24, 1926); Tuvan People's Republic (from November 24, 1926)	Partially recognized socialist republic. Satellite state of the Soviet Union.
Tibet; Capital: Lhasa	Unrecognized de facto independent state. Claimed by the Republic of China.
Transcaucasia – Transcaucasian Socialist Federative Soviet Republic (from March 12 to December 30, 1922); Capital: Tiflis	The Transcaucasian SFSR was a federation constituted by the Armenian SSR, the Azerbaijan SSR and the Georgian SSR. Became part of the Soviet Union from December 30, 1922.
Uhtua – Republic of Uhtua (to December 19, 1920); Capital: Uhtua	Unrecognized state.
(Ukrainian Soviet Socialist Republic) Ukraine, Soviet – Ukrainian Socialist Soviet Republic (to December 30, 1922); Capital: Kharkov	Soviet proto-state. Became part of the Soviet Union from December 30, 1922.
