= Petrozavodsky =

Petrozavodsky (masculine), Petrozavodskaya (feminine), or Petrozavodskoye (neuter) may refer to:

- Petrozavodsky Uyezd (1776–1927), an administrative division of the Russian Empire and the early Russian SFSR
- Petrozavodsky Urban Okrug, a municipal formation which the city of republic significance of Petrozavodsk in the Republic of Karelia, Russia is incorporated as
