= 1929 world leaders =

1929 world leaders may refer to:

- Sovereigns in 1929 - see List of sovereign states in 1929
- State leaders in 1929 - see List of state leaders in 1929
- Religious leaders in 1929 - see List of religious leaders in 1929
