= Emblem of the Karelo-Finnish Soviet Socialist Republic =

- Armiger: Government of the Karelo-Finnish Soviet Socialist Republic
- Adopted: February 10, 1941
- Shield: Baroque shield with hammer and sickle
- Supporters: Pine boughs, stalks of rye
- Motto: Kaikkien maiden proletaarit, liittykää yhteen! Workers of the world, unite!
- Other elements: Red star, rising sun, taiga backdrop, name "Karjalais-Suomalainen SNT"

The emblem of the Karelo-Finnish Soviet Socialist Republic was adopted on February 10, 1941 by the government of the Karelo-Finnish Soviet Socialist Republic and used until it was absorbed into the Russian Soviet Federative Socialist Republic in 1956.

The emblem is based on the state emblem of the Soviet Union. It shows symbols of agriculture (pine boughs and rye) and the local terrain (a swift-flowing river from the hills). The rising Sun stands for the future of the Karelo-Finnish nation; and the red star as well as the hammer and sickle for the victory of Communism and the "world-wide socialist community of states".

The slogan on the banner bears the Soviet Union state motto ("Workers of the world, unite!") in both the Russian and Finnish languages. In Finnish, it is "Kaikkien maiden proletaarit, liittykää yhteen!".

The name of the Karelo-Finnish SSR is shown in both Russian and Finnish.

From 1956 to 1991, the Karelian Autonomous Soviet Socialist Republic used a variant of the Emblem of the Russian Soviet Federative Socialist Republic.

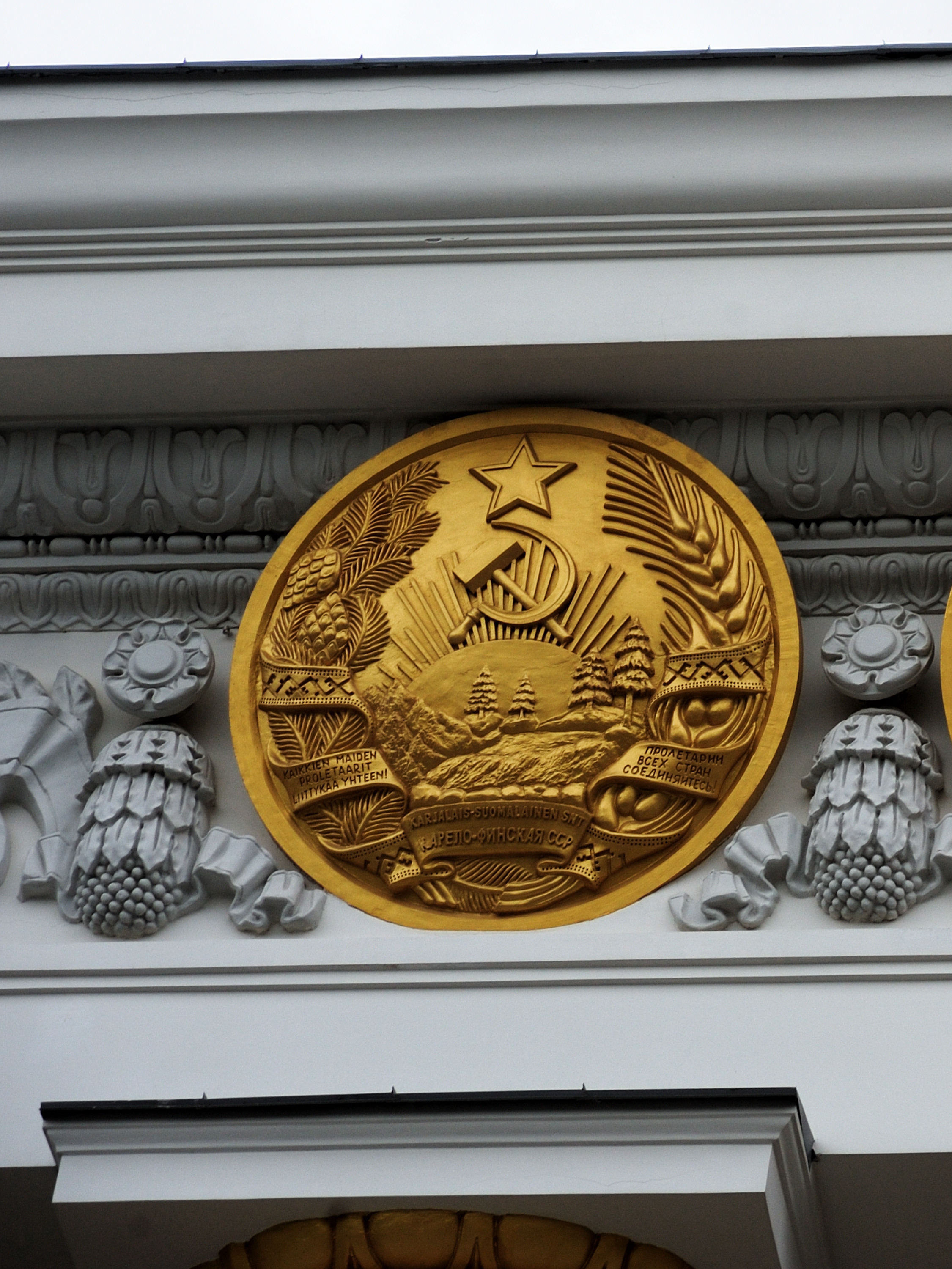
The Emblem of the Karelo-Finnish Soviet Socialist Republic facade of the Main Pavilion of VDNKh

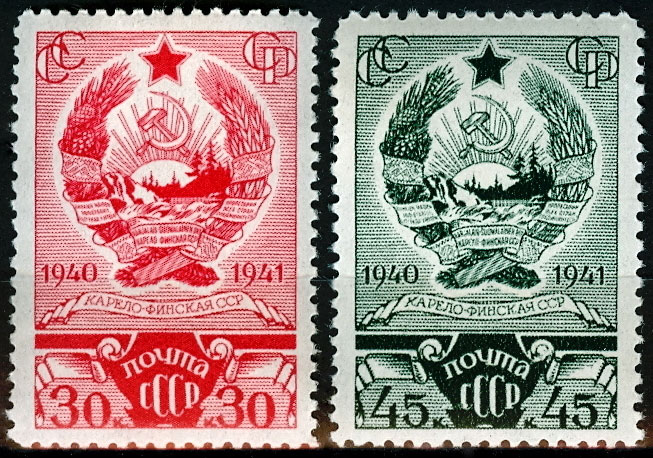
The Emblem of the Karelo-Finnish Soviet Socialist Republic on a 1941 postage stamp

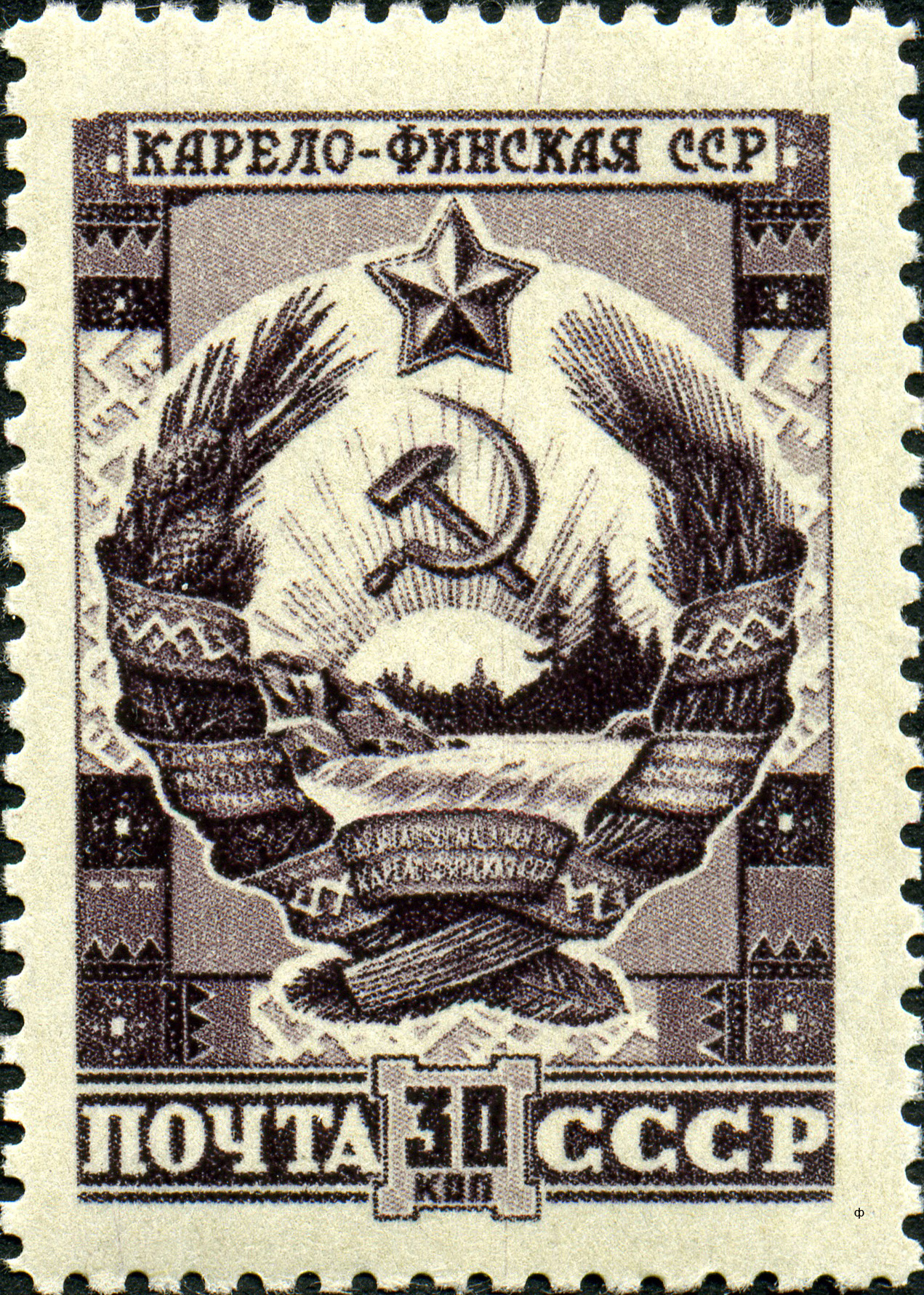
The Emblem of the Karelo-Finnish Soviet Socialist Republic on a 1947 postage stamp

== See also ==
- Coat of arms of Finland
- Coat of arms of the Republic of Karelia
