= Povenetsky Uyezd =

Povenetsky Uyezd (Russian: Повенецкий уезд) was one of the seven subdivisions of the Olonets Governorate of the Russian Empire. Its capital was Povenets. Povenetsky Uyezd was located in the northern part of the governorate (in the central part of the present-day Republic of Karelia).

== Demographics ==
At the time of the Russian Empire Census of 1897, Povenetsky Uyezd had a population of 26,381. Of these, 49.7% spoke Karelian, 49.4% Russian, 0.7% Finnish, 0.1% Yiddish and 0.1% Polish as their native language.
