= Coat of arms of the Province of Karelia =

Emblem of the Finnish region

The coat of arms of Karelia in Finland were first used in 1562, although the arms were likely presented at the burial of Gustav Vasa in 1560. The arms were used for the Swedish province of Karelia and have been used continuously since then. Variations of the arms are still used in two regions of Finland: North Karelia and South Karelia, in which the North Karelian version is the original one.

Only South Karelia (excluding the northern portion of the region) was part of Sweden during the reign of Gustav Vasa. North Karelia was not part of the Swedish Kingdom until 1617, when Sweden gained the area from Russia following the Treaty of Stolbovo. South Karelia belonged to Sweden from 1323 until 1743, when Russia annexed territory from Sweden following the Russo-Swedish War of 1741-1743. This region was given to the Grand Duchy of Finland by the Russian Empire in 1812 as a gesture of goodwill.

The blazon for the arms may be translated as follows: A golden crown above two duelling arms, sinister gauntleted arm holding a sword and dexter mailed arm a scimitar, all silver except for golden hafts and gauntlet joint. Ducal coronet.

The two hands holding a sword and a scimitar are generally seen as symbol of Karelia's position between the Swedish and Russian realms. The coat of arms of Finland use the sword and scimitar in a similar manner.

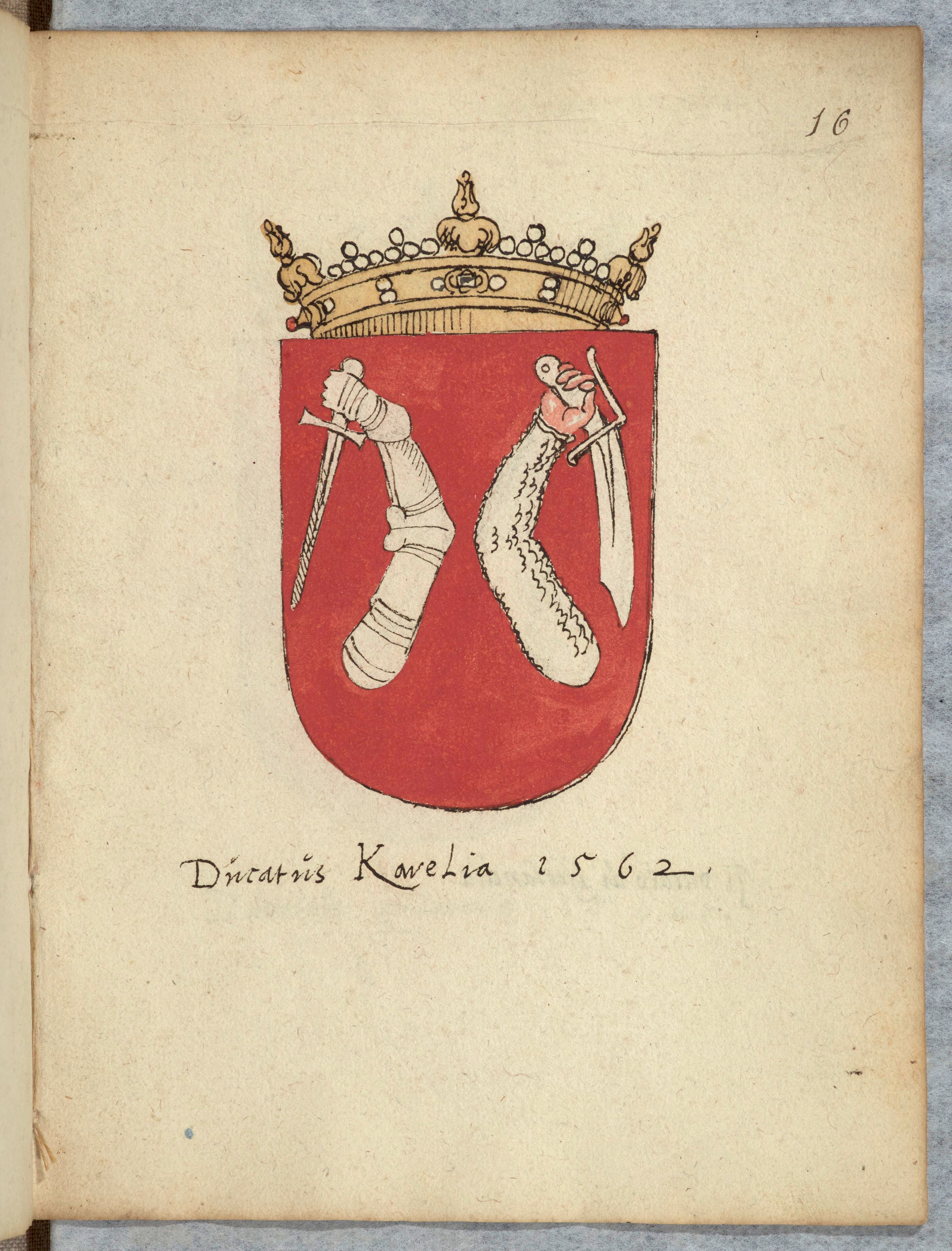
Coat of arms of Karelia from the 1562

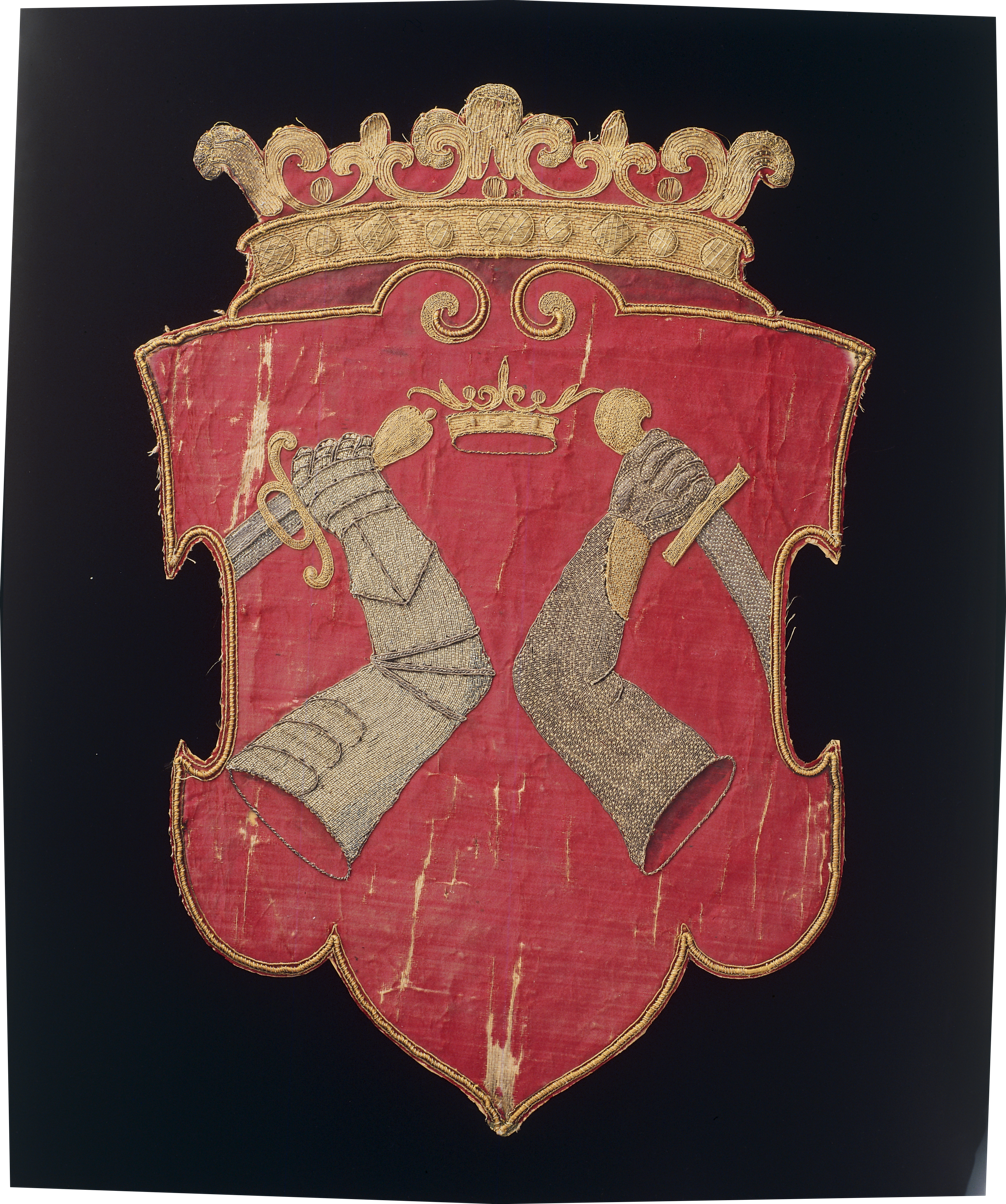
Coat of arms of Karelia from 1630s

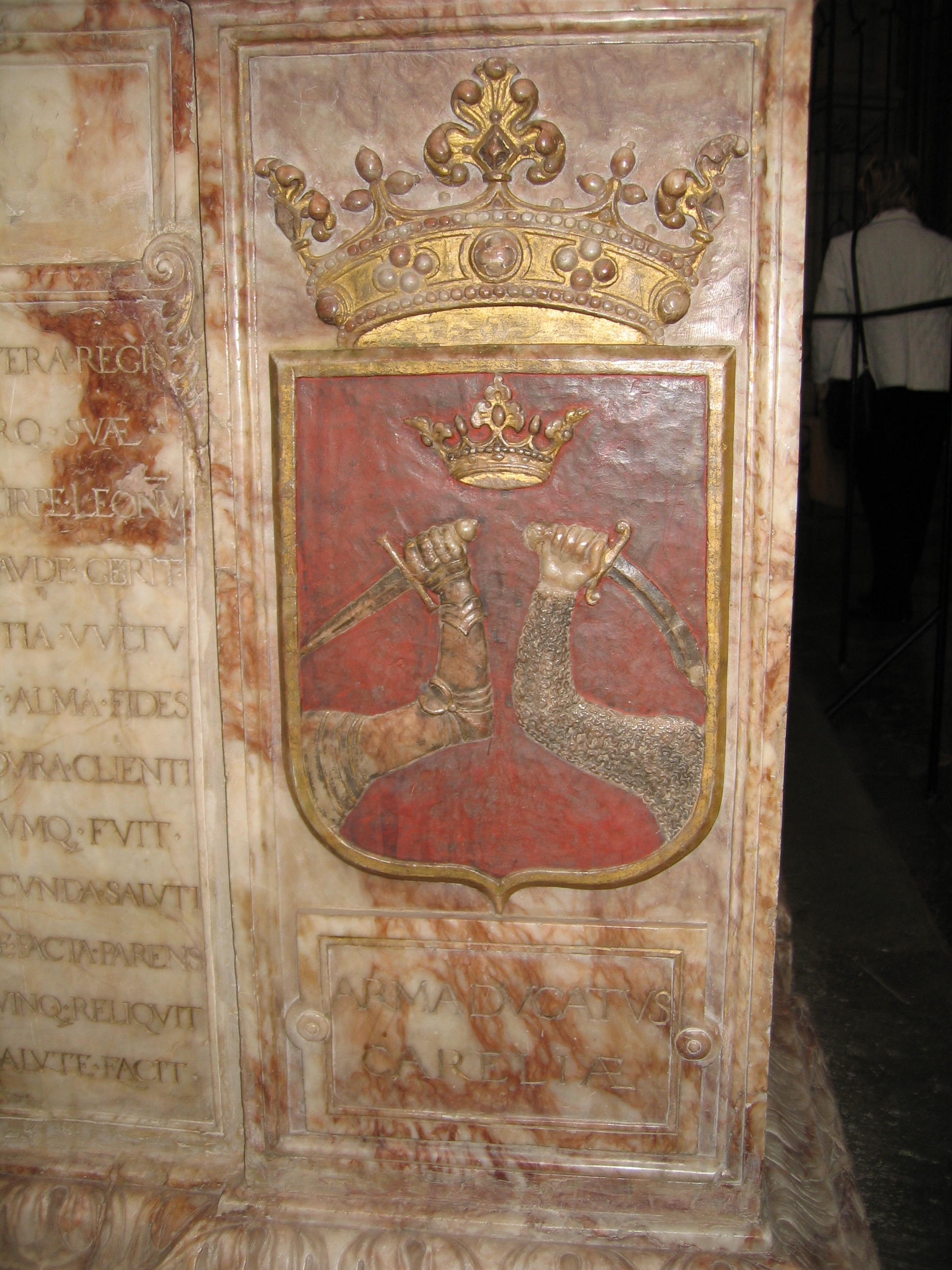
The Arms of Karelia on the tomb of Gustavus I (Uppsala cathedral, Sweden)

The Arms of the historical Province of Karelia

The Arms of the Finnish Region of North Karelia (the original type without the ducal coronet).

The Arms of the Finnish Region of South Karelia.

== See also ==
- Coat of arms of the Republic of Karelia in Russia
- Karelia (historical province of Finland)
- Kingdom of Finland continued as the Governorate of Finland
