= Alexander Shotman =

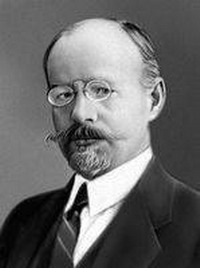

Alexander Edmund (Vasil’evich) Shotman (Russian: Алекса́ндр Васи́льевич Шо́тман; 6 September 1880, Aleksandrovskoe – 30 October 1937) was a Russian Bolshevik revolutionary and statesman of Finnish origin.

He joined the Union of the Struggle for the Liberation of the Working Class in 1895.

== Biography ==
=== Early life ===
Born into a working-class family. His grandfather was a lensmann and his father was a former filmmaker who moved to St. Petersburg. He started to work as a machinist from a young age in the Lessner, Nobel and Obukhovsky factories.

=== Revolutionary activities ===
In 1899 Shotman joined the St. Petersburg League of Struggle for the Emancipation of the Working Class and the Russian Social Democratic Labour Party at the same time. Shotman was a delegate to the Second Congress of the RSDLP and joined its Bolshevik faction after the split.

During the 1905 Revolution, he was a member of the St. Petersburg Party Committee and after his expulsion in the fall of 1905 he was a member of the Odessa Committee. Upon his return to the capital, he was co-opted into the St. Petersburg Committee, again working in the Vyborg region. In 1908 A. V. Shotman was a member of the Central Board of the Union of Metalworkers; at the same time, he worked in the underground organization of the Vasileostrovsky district.

From 1910 to 1913 he was a Member of the Helsingfors Committee of the Finnish Social Democratic Party. In connection with the failure of the military organization of the Baltic Fleet, he fled abroad, where he participated in the Poronin meeting of the Central Committee of the RSDLP (outskirts of Krakow, October 1913) with party workers, and was co-opted into the Central Committee and the Russian Bureau of the Central Committee of the RSDLP. Directed to clandestine work in Russia, in November 1913 he was arrested in Yekaterinoslav and exiled for three years to the Narym region

Upon returning from exile after the February Revolution, A. V. Shotman became a member of the Tomsk Committee of the RSDLP (b), and was then sent to Finland. From June 1917, he was a member of the Petrograd district committee of the RSDLP (b), a delegate to the VI Party Congress of the RSDLP (b), and a member of the Provisional Council of the Russian Republic. Shotman was elected as a deputy of the Constituent Assembly from the Petrograd provincial electoral district according to list No. 2 ( RSDLP (b) ). After the July Days, the Central Committee of the Party maintained contact with V.I.Lenin and Grigory Zinoviev, who were in Razliv, and organized Lenin's transfer to Helsingforsin August 1917. He took part in an enlarged meeting of the Central Committee of the RSDLP (b) on October 6 (29), 1917 in Udelnaya, which confirmed the party's course towards an armed uprising.

=== Soviet Russia ===
After the October Revolution Shoman became deputy People's Commissar of Posts and Telegraphs, and in 1918 a member of the Presidium of the Supreme Council of National Economy.

In 1920 he was appointed Chairman of the Ural-Siberian Commission of the Council of Labour and Defence and a member of the Siberian Revolutionary Committee.

From July 25, 1923 to the end of 1924, Alexander Shotman was the chairman of the Central Executive Committee of the Autonomous Karelian SSR. He was elected as a delegate to the XI All-Russian and II All-Union Congresses of Soviets.

In the 1930s, he was authorized by the Presidium of the All-Russian Central Executive Committee for special affairs, head of the personnel department of the Supreme Council of the National Economy.

=== Arrest and execution ===
According to Lenin, Shotman was “an old party worker he knew very well who enjoys absolute trust”. However this would not help his case during the Great Purge and Shotman was arrested on June 25, 1937, and was convicted on October 29 for “participation in an anti-Soviet Trotskyist organization” and was sentenced to death by the Military Collegium of the USSR Supreme Court. A day later, on October 30, 1937, the sentence was carried out.

He was buried at the Donskoy cemetery. Shotman was rehabilitated on December 24, 1955 by the decision of the Military Collegium of the Supreme Court of the USSR.

== Works ==
- Memories of the Fight: How the Spark Kindled the Flame, (1935) Moscow: Moscow Co-operative Publishing Society of foreign workers in the U.S.S.R. (in English)
