= Karelian Autonomous Soviet Socialist Republic =

Autonomous republic of the Russian SFSR (1923–1940, 1956–1991)

Karelian Autonomous Soviet Socialist Republic Карельская Автономная Советская Социалистическая Республика Karjalan autonominen sosialistinen neuvostotasavalta
- ASSR of the Russian SFSR
- 1923–1940; 1956–1991
- Flag (1978–1991) Emblem (1978–1991)

- Location of Karelian ASSR within RSFSR and Soviet Union (1956–1991)
- Capital: Petrozavodsk
- Area
  - Coordinates: 61.783333°N 34.35°E
  - 1989: 180,500 km^{2} (69,700 sq mi)
- Population
  - 1989: 790,150
- Government
  - Type: Autonomous Soviet Socialist Republic
- Chairman
  - 1923–1935 (first): Edvard Gylling
  - 1990–1991 (last): Viktor Stepanov
- History
  - Established: 25 July 1923
  - Promoted to SSR: 31 March 1940
  - Demotion to ASSR: 6 July 1956
  - Sovereignty declared: 9 August 1990
  - Renamed to the Karelian SSR: 24 May 1991
  - Republic of Karelia: 13 November 1991
Preceded by	Succeeded by
1923: Karelian Labor Commune; 1956: Karelo-Finnish SSR	1940: Karelo-Finnish SSR; 1991: Republic of Karelia

The Karelian Autonomous Soviet Socialist Republic, (Note: Russian: Каре́льская Автоно́мная Сове́тская Социалисти́ческая Респу́блика, romanized: Karelskaya Avtonomnaya Sovetskaya Sotsialisticheskaya Respublika; Finnish: Karjalan autonominen sosialistinen neuvostotasavalta) Karelian ASSR (Note: Russian: Каре́льская АССР, romanized: Karelskaya ASSR; Finnish: Karjalan ASNT) for short, sometimes referred to as Russian Karelia, East Karelia or simply Karelia, was an autonomous republic of the Russian SFSR within the Soviet Union, with its capital in Petrozavodsk. It existed from 25 July 1923 to 31 March 1940 and again from 6 July 1956 to 13 November 1991. It was succeeded by the Republic of Karelia.

== History ==
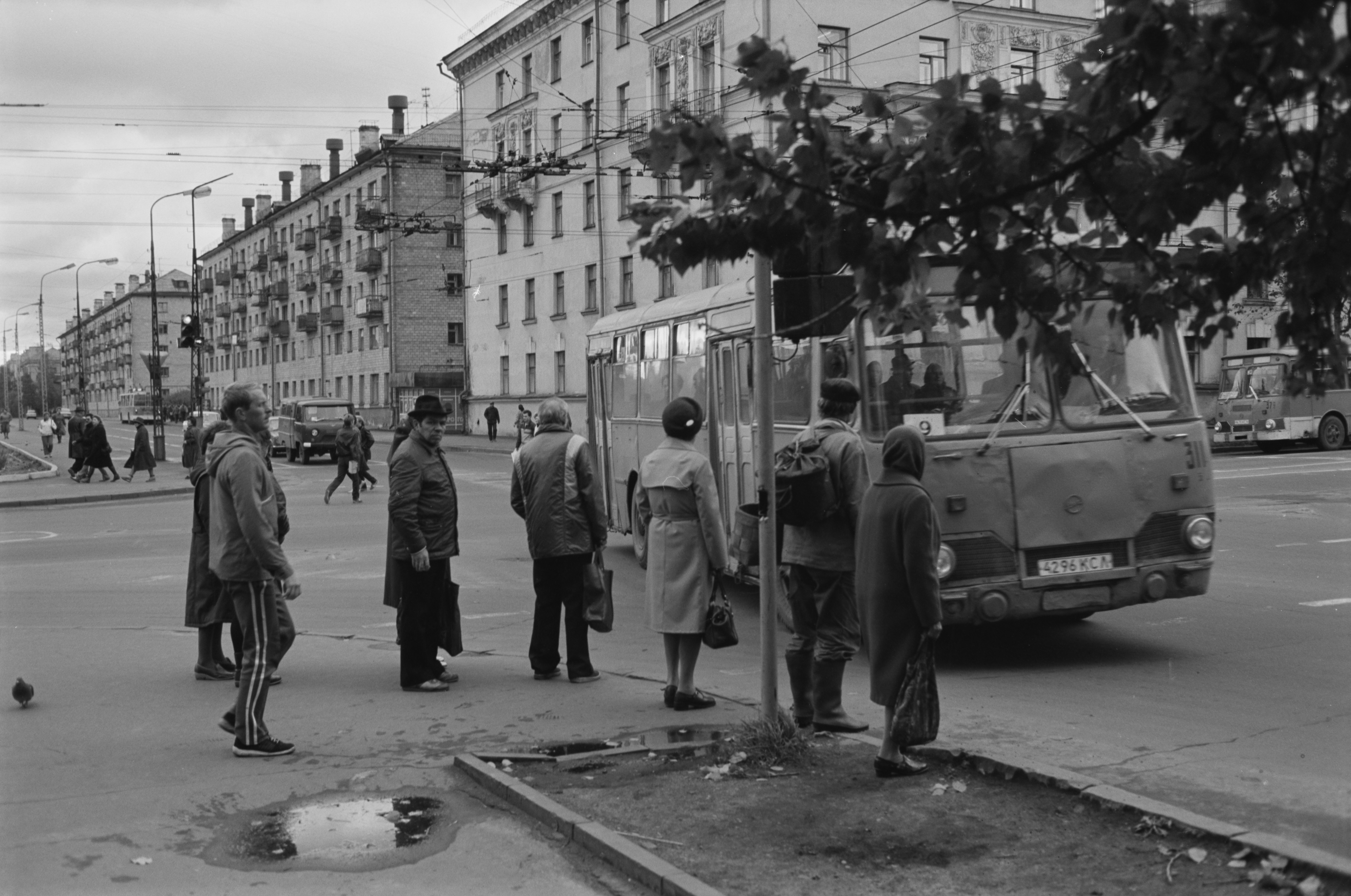
Town Kondopoga in Soviet Karelia on September 1988

Originally called the Autonomous Karelian Soviet Socialist Republic (AKSSR; Finnish: Autonominen Karjalan sosialistinen neuvostotasavalta, Russian: Автономная Карельская Социалистическая Советская Республика) until 1936, the Karelian ASSR was formed as a part of the Russian SFSR by the Resolution of the Presidium of the All-Russian Central Executive Committee (VTsIK) of June 27, 1923 and by the Decree of the VTsIK and the Council of People's Commissars of July 25, 1923 from the Karelian Labor Commune. In 1927, the ASSR was divided into districts, which replaced the old volosts.

Prior to the Great Purge and World War II, the leaders of the Karelian ASSR (most of which were socialist Finnish immigrants) were applying a significant policy of indigenization over the ASSR. This was mainly taken care of by the long-time leader of the Karelian ASSR, Edvard Gylling. Finnish was used as the primary language for education and administration, with Russian in second. It's believed that Gylling, a Finnish socialist, wished to create his own Red Finland in Soviet Karelia following the defeat of the Reds in the Finnish Civil War. Because of this, the Karelian ASSR was sometimes referred to as "the Gyllingian Empire" in Finnish propaganda.

However, with the Great Purge and the Finnish Operation of the NKVD, Gylling, among the rest of the Finnish leadership, was removed in 1935 and later executed. Gylling was replaced by Tver Karelian Pavel Bushuev, who soon also got framed and then purged. Pyotr Soljakov, a Russian politician, replaced Bushuev, and he served as the chairman of the Karelian ASSR until it ceased to exist in 1940.

Consequently, any indigenization process and effort faded away, giving way to Russification instead. A heavily Russified standard for written Karelian language was introduced and speaking Karelian or Finnish in public was banned. In June 1938, Gennady Kupriyanov was elected as First Secretary, promising to exile Finns from Petrozavodsk in his inaugural speech and commencing a purge of Finnish and Karelian personnel. At least 9,100 Finns were sentenced to death, with estimates of the total death toll ranging as high as 30,000 or even 40,000 people.

In 1938, the Kandalakshsky District was transferred from the Karelian ASSR to the Murmansk Oblast.

From 1940 to 1956, territory annexed from Finland (which had briefly constituted a puppet Finnish Democratic Republic) was incorporated with the Karelian ASSR to form the Karelo-Finnish Soviet Socialist Republic, which had the status of a union republic in the federal structure of the Soviet Union. However, by this time, only a small portion of the population of this region was of Karelian or Finnish ethnic background. (Note: In the Soviet Census of 1939, Karelians were 23% of the population and Finns 2%; by the census of 1959, Karelians were 13% and Finns 4%.) The K-FSSR was also de facto fully under Moscow's control. Some later historians believe that this unorthodox upgrade was likely a "convenient means for facilitating the possible incorporation of additional Finnish territory" (or all of Finland) or "at least a way to keep Finland continuously under the gun". The K-FSSR also conflicted with the criteria outlined by Stalin in his address introducing the then-current 1936 Soviet Constitution, as its population never reached a million, and neither Karelians or Finns formed a majority in it.

On July 16, 1956, the K-FSSR was downgraded from a union republic to an autonomous republic, and retroceded to the Russian SFSR. Due to its ethnic composition, it was also decided in 1958 to abolish the compulsory study of the Finnish language within the KASSR. Finnish retained its status as an official language, however, but its influence and use had now shrunk to a very minor point in comparison to earlier times.

The last territorial change of the Karelian ASSR happened in 1987, when the locality of Poyakonda was transferred to the Murmansk Oblast.

Beginning on August 9, 1990, the Karelian ASSR declared state sovereignty and was renamed to the Karelian Soviet Socialist Republic. (Note: Russian: Каре́льская Сове́тская Социалисти́ческая Респу́блика, romanized: Karelskaya Sovetskaya Sotsialisticheskaya Respublika; Finnish: Karjalan sosialistinen neuvostotasavalta) The Karelian SSR was renamed to the Republic of Karelia on November 13, 1991, and remains a federal subject of Russia to this day.

== Administration ==
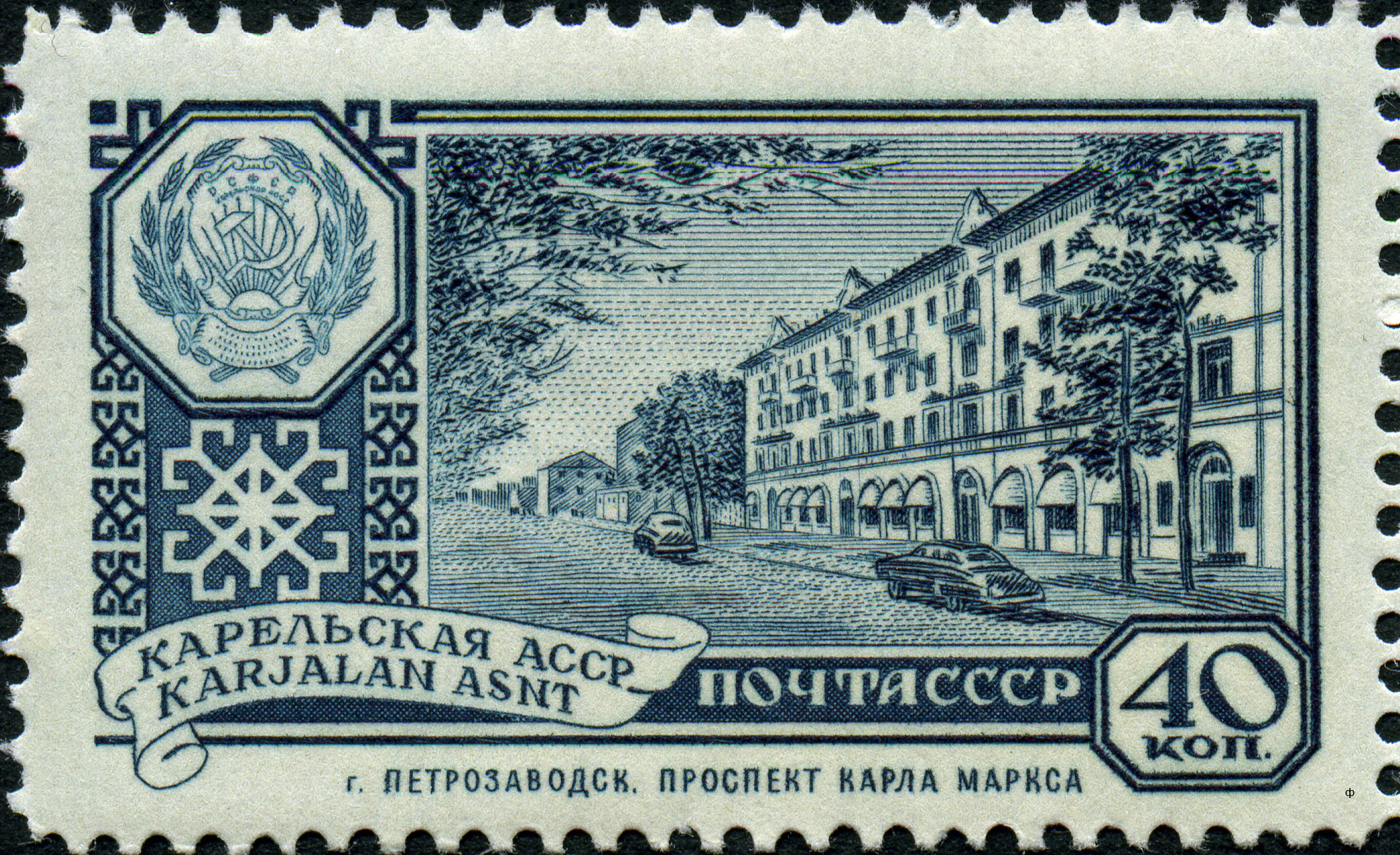
Stamp, Capitals of autonomous republics, Karelian ASSR, Petrozavodsk 1960

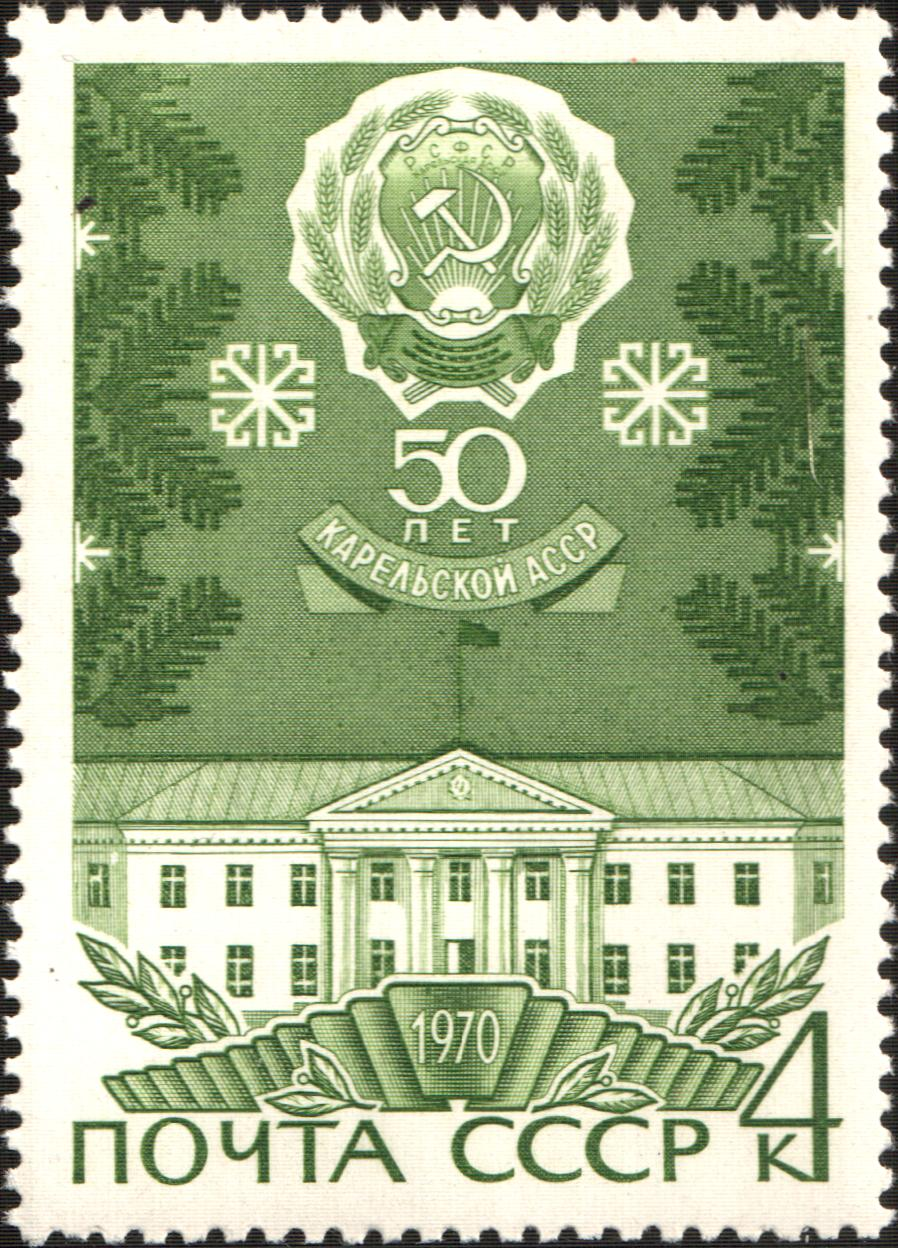
Stamp "50 years of the Karelian Autonomous Soviet Socialist Republic" Mail USSR 1970

=== Chairmen of the Presidium of the Supreme Soviet ===
- Aleksandr Vasilevich Shotman (25 June 1923 – 1924)
- Aleksandr Fyodorovich Nuorteva (December 1924 – May 1928)
- Nikolay Aleksandrovich Yushchyev (January 1929 – 13 January 1934)
- Vasiliy Petrovich Averkyev (13 January 1934 – 1935)
- Nikolay Vasilyevich Arkhipov (February 1935 – November 1937)
- Mark Vasilyevich Gorbachev (November 1937 – 31 March 1940)
- Pavel Stepanovich Prokkonen (16 July 1956 – 18 July 1979)
- N. Kalinin (acting) (18 July 1979 – 18 August 1979)
- Ivan Pavlovich Mankin (18 August 1979 – 9 March 1984)
- N. Kalinin (acting) (9 March 1984 – 18 April 1984)
- Ivan Ilyich Senkin (18 April 1984 – 12 December 1985)
- V. Cheremovsky (acting) (12 December 1985 – 21 January 1986)
- Kuzma Filippovich Filatov (21 January 1986 – 27 December 1989)
- Viktor Nikolayevich Stepanov (27 December 1989 – 18 April 1990)

== See also ==
- Karelian Regional Committee of the Communist Party of the Soviet Union
