= Olonets Government of Southern Karelia =

1920 de facto state in Northern Europe

Provisional Government of Olonets Aunuksen väliaikainen hallitus
- 1920
- Flag Coat of arms

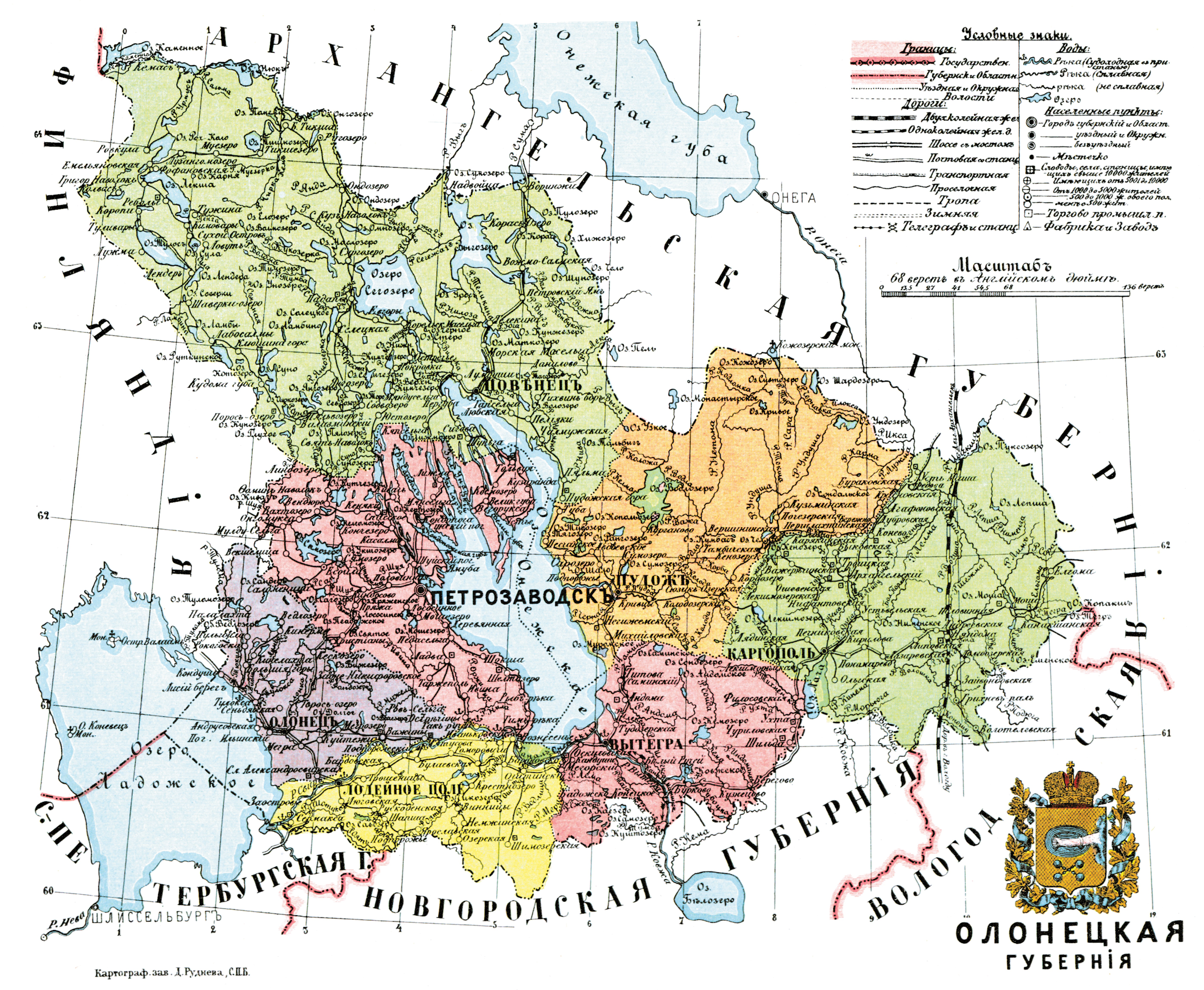
- Area claimed by the Olonets Government
- Capital: Olonets
- Administrative center: Helsinki
- Common languages: Karelian (Livvi); Finnish; Russian

Government
  - Leader: O. Åkesson
- History
  - Established: 1920
- Currency: Finnish markka (FIM)
| Preceded by | Succeeded by |
| Soviet Russia | Karelian United Government |

The Olonets Government, later called the Provisional Government of Olonets (Finnish: Aunuksen väliaikainen hallitus, Livvi: Anuksenlinnun aijalline halličus, Russian: Олонецкое правительство), was a short-lived unrecognized state originally created on May 15, 1918, as the Olonets Government of Southern Karelia, following Finland's declaration of war on Soviet Russia. Following the capture of Olonets on April 23, 1919, the country was renamed to the Provisional Caretaker Government of Olonets (Finnish: Aunuksen väliaikainen hoitokunta, Livvi: Anuksenlinnun aijalline beroguskundu) during the Olonets Expedition. The Olonets Government was cemented in May 1920, and found recognition and support from Finland, who was a keen supplier of money, in the form of loans and volunteers. On 27 June 1919 the Government went into exile in Finland, following the Soviet Russian capture of Vitele. In October 1920 the Olonets government merged with the Republic of Uhtua to form the Karelian United Government.

The Olonets Government was governed by the Olonets Committee, which was located in Helsinki. The committee was responsible for monetary, geographical and military matters relating to the Olonets Government, and their actions were approved by the Finnish Government on June 30, 1919. The Olonets Volunteer Army was created around July 1919, and it served as the de facto military force of the Olonets Government. The Olonets Government also established White Guards in most cities and villages which were under Olonets Government control.
