= Petrozavodsky Uyezd =

Petrozavodsky Uyezd (Russian: Петрозаводский уезд) was one of the seven subdivisions of the Olonets Governorate of the Russian Empire. Its capital was Petrozavodsk. Petrozavodsky Uyezd was located in the central part of the governorate (mostly in the southern part of the present-day Republic of Karelia, with one part in the northeastern corner of Leningrad Oblast).

== Demographics ==
At the time of the Russian Empire Census of 1897, Petrozavodsky Uyezd had a population of 79,712. Of these, 67.1% spoke Russian, 22.1% Karelian, 9.1% Veps, 2.1% Finnish, 0.3% Yiddish and 0.2% Polish as their native language.
