= Karelian United Government =

1920–1923 de facto state in Northern Europe

Karelian United Government Karjalan keskushallitus
- 1920-1923
- Flag Coat of arms

- Area claimed by the Karelian United Government
- Official languages: Karelian; Finnish; Russian
- Government: Provisional government
- History
  - Established: 20 December 1920
  - Disestablished: 23 July 1923
Preceded by	Succeeded by
Republic of Uhtua; Olonets Government of Southern Karelia	Karelian Labor Commune
- Today part of: Republic of Karelia as a subject of Russian Federation

The Karelian United Government (Note: Finnish: Karjalan keskushallitus, Karelian: Karjalan keskushallitšus, Russian: Карельское объединённое правительство, romanized: Karel'skoye ob"yedinyonnoye pravitel'stvo) was a short-lived state that existed from 1920 to 1923, as a merger of the Republic of Uhtua and the Olonets Government of Southern Karelia.

== History ==
On 20 December 1920, the Karelian United Government formed in exile in Finland as a merger of the Uhtua Government and the Olonets Government of Southern Karelia. 11 days later, on 31 December, Finland ceded Repola and Porajärvi to the Russian Socialist Federative Soviet Republic.

On 21 April 1921, the Republic of Eastern Karelia (Itä Karjala) was declared independent. Between October 1921 and February 1922 Karelian military troops, supported by the KUG, moved from Finnish territory into Eastern Karelia. The Forest Guerrillas, who were the main anti-Bolshevik resistance movement during the Heimosodat in Karelia were driven across the border into Finland by 1922.

From December 1922 until February 1923 East Karelia was occupied by the Soviet Union.

On 23 July 1923, the Permanent Court of Arbitration refused to state an advisory opinion on the status of Karelia regarding the Treaty of Tartu. Later that year the exile government was dissolved.
