= Republic of Uhtua =

1919–1920 unrecognised state in Northern Europe

Republic of East Karelia Itä-Karjalan tasavalta
- 1919–1920
- Flag Coat of arms

- Parishes represented in the provisional government marked green, approximate area controlled by the government circled.
- Capital: Uhtua
- Recognised regional languages: Karelian; Finnish; Russian
- Government: Provisional government
  - Chairman of the Provisional Government: Antti Vierma
- History
  - Established: 21 June 1919
  - Disestablished: 10 December 1920
Preceded by	Succeeded by
Russian Soviet Federative Socialist Republic	Karelian United Government; Karelian Labor Commune
- Today part of: Republic of Karelia as a subject of Russian Federation

The Republic of Uhtua, also Provisional Government of Karelia, officially called the Republic of East Karelia (Note: Finnish: Karjalan väliaikainen hallitus; Karelian: Uhtuon tazavaldu; Russian: Временное правительство Карелии, romanized: Vremmenoye pravitel'stvo Karelii) was an unrecognized state that existed from 1919 to 1920, formed out of five volosts in the Kemsky Uyezd of the Arkhangelsk Governorate.

== Prelude ==
Discussions about Karelia becoming its own state emerged in 1906, when on 3 August, the Union of White Karelians was created in Tampere, Grand Duchy of Finland. In 1911, the Union was banned, but it was later revived in 1922 as the Academic Karelia Society, to take a direct part in the creation of the Republic of Uhtua.

After the Bolsheviks came to power, most Karelian peasants were declared kulaks and were subject to loss of grain and cattle. This, as well as finding Karelians in combat zones during the civil wars in Russia and Finland, and foreign military intervention in northern Russia persuaded the population to all following events.

Two years before the state was created, the Heimosodat began. They were a series of expeditions with the final goal of annexing the Baltic Finnic peoples territories into the Finnish State. During the Aunus and Viena expeditions, short-lived bases, or governments, existed in Olonets Karelia and White Karelia.

== Finnish intervention ==
The Republic was created during the Finnish Civil War, after White Guard units, which occupied the area in late March 1918, placed the villages of Vuokkiniemi and Uhtua under direct order from Carl Wilhelm Malm. In the villages and the surrounding counties, a local government was organized under the leadership of patriotic supporters for the independence of Karelia from the RSFSR - The Committee of Uhtua (Finnish: Uhtuan toimikunta), which was led by Tuisku. We also know the name of another member of the Toimikunta - Paavo Ahava.

== History ==
The state took shape on 21 July 1919, together with the establishment of the Provisional Government of White Karelia, headed by S. Tikhonov. The center of the village territorial entity was Uhtua. Initially, the state was chosen to be a part of Finland, and on 14 November 1919, Tikhonov appointed a request to the Government of Finland. Later, however, the state was established as an independent state in alliance with Finland. Most of the locals were largely uninterested in the matter of becoming an independent state, but rather were seeking Finnish protection from the crossfire of Bolsheviks, Allies and the White Army.

On 21 March 1920, the Government convened a congress of representatives of 11 northern counties of concern to the Provisional Government of White Karelia. The congress was attended by 116 delegates.

On the first day of the Congress, the issue of state symbols was addressed.

It is proposed that we develop a national Karelian emblem and colors to have in a national flag. By discussing, we have approved the following: Emblem - a bear in front of a log with an axe in their paw. Flag - Bicolour with red at the bottom, and yellow at the top, in the canton, the constellation Ursa Major. The final opinion on both proposals may not be changed until the next meeting

On 29 March 1920, the symbols were finally approved. The author of the sketches was the Finnish artist Akseli Gallen-Kallela. The coat of arms was a red-green bicolour Varangian shield, topped with traditional headdress loggers. The shield was a picture of a bear in black with a vesuri in their paws. By the bear's feet was a black chain, and above it were white sparks symbolizing the northern lights. The national flag was a black Scandinavian cross with a red border, situated on a green cloth. The colors of the flag symbolize the following: green - a symbol of the country's forest and nature, red - bloodshed for the homeland, and the joy and fire, as in the ancient Karelians used slash-and-burn agriculture, black - the native land and sadness. On the state flag, it had a red canton with white northern lights. The war flag was made in the same style but had three plaits and a complementary Bear with a vesuri in the clutches (there is evidence that in the center of the black cross on it was a red square). There was also a pilot flag (luotsilippu), postal flag (postilippu), a customs flag (tullilippu), and a war pennant, in a similar manner to Finnish Household pennants.

The congress decided to secede from Soviet Russia and, guided by the Soviet authorities declared the principle of "the right of nations to self-determination", they declared independence as the Republic of Uhtua. The declaration of the Congress stated: "Karelia itself must govern their own affairs and to secede from Russia". The congress also thanked Finland for their promise to "help and support", who had a representative at the Congress present. The Government was renamed the Provisional Government of Karelia.

In late April 1920, at a station, a delegation of Karelian Beloostrov interim government and handed over to the requirement of the separation of Karelia from Soviet Russia Soviet border troops Commissioner.

Based on the decisions of the Congress, in May 1920 the Republic of Uhtua was recognized by Finland, which even gave the republic a loan of 8 million Finnish markka. However, on 18 May 1920 the Red Army went to Uhtua to claim back the republic. The state government fled to the village Vuokkiniemi, which was 30 km from the Soviet-Finnish border, from where they moved to Finland.

Karelia remained a part of the RSFSR, where on its territory on June 8, 1920, was formed autonomous regional association Karelian Labor Commune that existed until 25 July 1923, when it was formed as the Karelian ASSR.

During the negotiations between the RSFSR and Finland, the Finns promoted territorial claims to Karelia, but due to the Red Army's size, the Finnish government was forced to abandon the idea. As a result, on 14 October 1920, the Treaty of Tartu was signed between the RSFSR and Finland.

== The East Karelian Uprising ==
However, as it turned out, the Government of Finland and Karelian supporters of independence were not going to completely abandon their claims. 10 December 1920 in Vyborg the Karelian united government was created, which, in addition to the Provisional Government of Karelia, became the Olonets government and other national education.

In October 1921 in the territory of the Karelian Labour Commune in Tungudskoy parish was established as the underground Karelian Temporary Committee. In November and December 1921, the Finnish troops reoccupied part of the regions of Karelia, which began the Soviet–Finnish conflict. In Karelia, martial law was imposed, commander of the Karelian Front was appointed commander of A. I. Sedyakin. By early January 1922, the units from Petrozavodsk of the Red Army defeated the main group of Finns, and in early February 1922 the Center Committee Karelian village of Uhtua was re-occupied by the Red Army. As a result of the successes of Soviet troops, Finland was forced to cease hostilities. The Republic of Uhtua ceased to exist.

== Gallery ==
Civil flag.

State flag.

War flag.

Naval pilot flag.

Postal flag.

Customs flag.

Otava. The previous flag. Used 21 June 1918 – 19 March 1920.

Coat of arms.

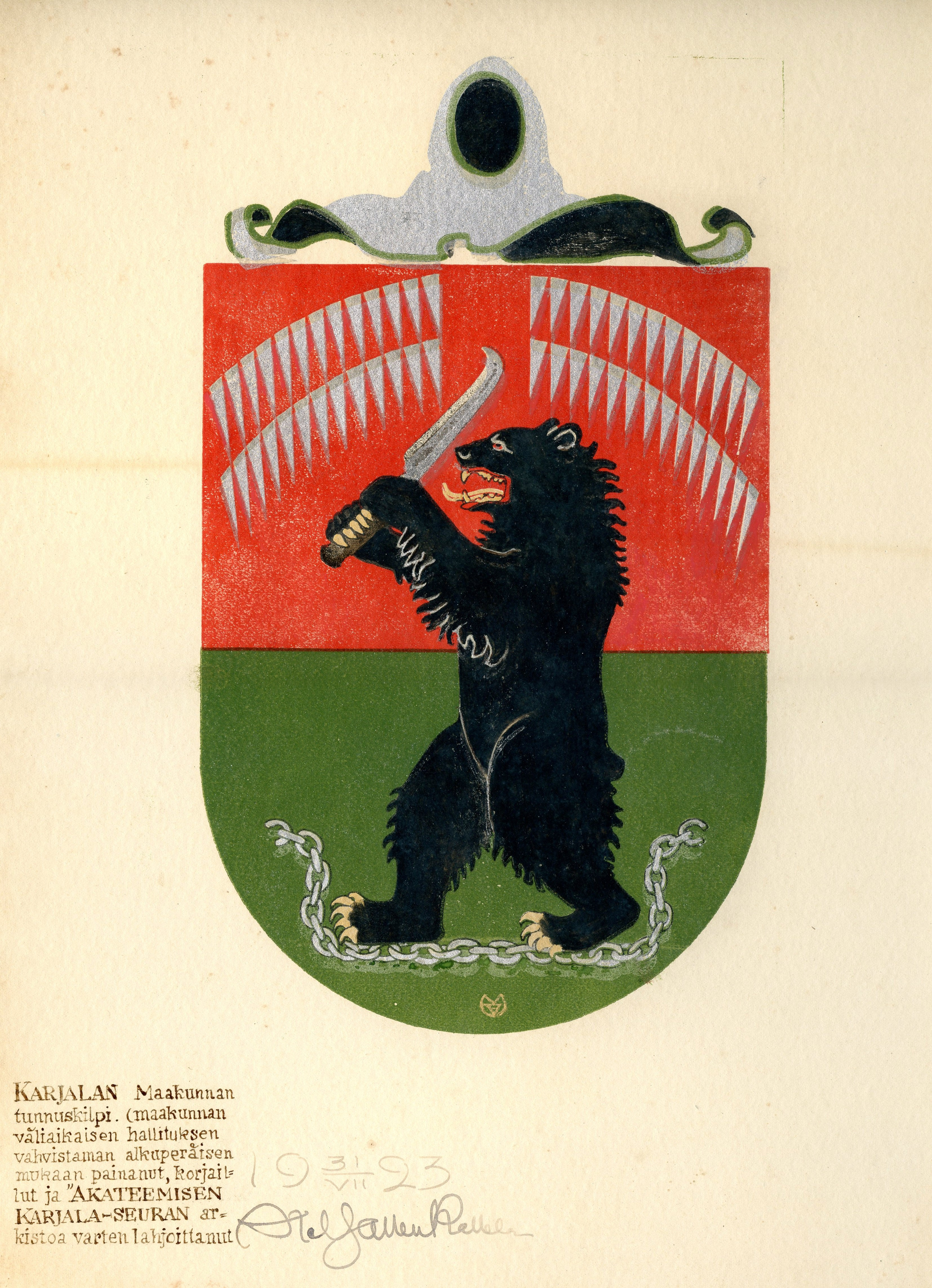
Copy of the original arms by the author Gallen-Kallela from 1923.

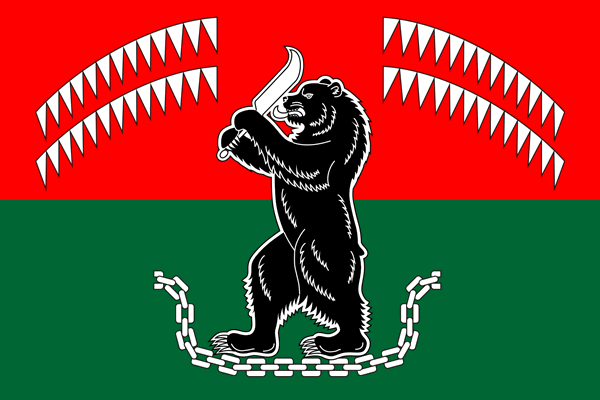
The current flag of Uhtua. Design taken from the coat of arms.

== See also ==
- Russo-Finnish wars
- Finland–Russia relations
- North Ingria
- Aunus expedition
