= Finnish military administration in Eastern Karelia =

1941–1944 Finnish military administration

Military Administration in Eastern Karelia Itä-Karjalan sotilashallinto
- Military administration by Finland
- 1941–1944
- Coat of arms

- Finnish advance to Eastern Karelia during the Continuation War. The military administration extended further north. Red area inside the black borders was re-annexed directly to Finland on 9 December 1941.
- Capital: Mikkeli (1941); Joensuu (1941–1943); Äänislinna (1943–1944)
- Government
- Military Commander
  - 1941–1942: Väinö Kotilainen
  - 1942–1943: J.V. Arajuuri
  - 1943–1944: Olli Paloheimo
- Historical era: World War II
  - Military occupation: 1941
  - Disestablished: 1944
- Today part of: Russia

The Finnish military administration in Eastern Karelia was an interim administrative system established in those areas of the Karelo-Finnish Soviet Socialist Republic (KFSSR) of the Soviet Union which were occupied by the Finnish army during the Continuation War. The military administration was set up on 15 July 1941 and it ended during the summer of 1944. The goal of the administration was to prepare the region for eventual annexation by Finland.

The administration did not encompass the territories ceded to the Soviet Union in the Moscow Peace Treaty and subsequently recaptured by the Finns during the summer offensive of 1941.

== Background ==
Finnish interest in Russian Karelia goes back to the 19th century. Eastern Karelia was seen as the cradle of Finnish culture and the ancient land of the heroic sagas of the Kalevala. Along with the rise of Finnish anti-Russian sentiment, the "Karelian question" became politicized. During and after the Finnish Civil War, several voluntary expeditions were launched with the intended goal of liberating the Karelian "kindred people", without success.

The Continuation War and belief in a quick German victory over the Soviet Union once again gave rise to Finnish irredentism. The legality of the Finnish claims on Eastern Karelia was justified by both ethno-cultural and military security factors. During the spring of 1941, when the Finnish political leadership understood the full extent of the German plans concerning the Soviet Union, president Ryti commissioned professor of geography Väinö Auer and historian Eino Jutikkala to demonstrate "scholarly" that Eastern Karelia formed a natural part of the Finnish living space. The resulting book Finnlands Lebensraum ("Finland's Living Space") was published in the autumn of 1941, and was intended to legitimize Finnish claims and actions to the international audience. A similar book by historian Jalmari Jaakkola, Die Ostfrage Finnlands ("Finland's Eastern Question") was published in the summer of the same year.

The Finnish expansionist aims are present in Finnish Commander-in-Chief C. G. E. Mannerheim's Order of the Day given on 10 July 1941, which was based on an earlier declaration given by him during the Finnish civil war.

== Organization ==
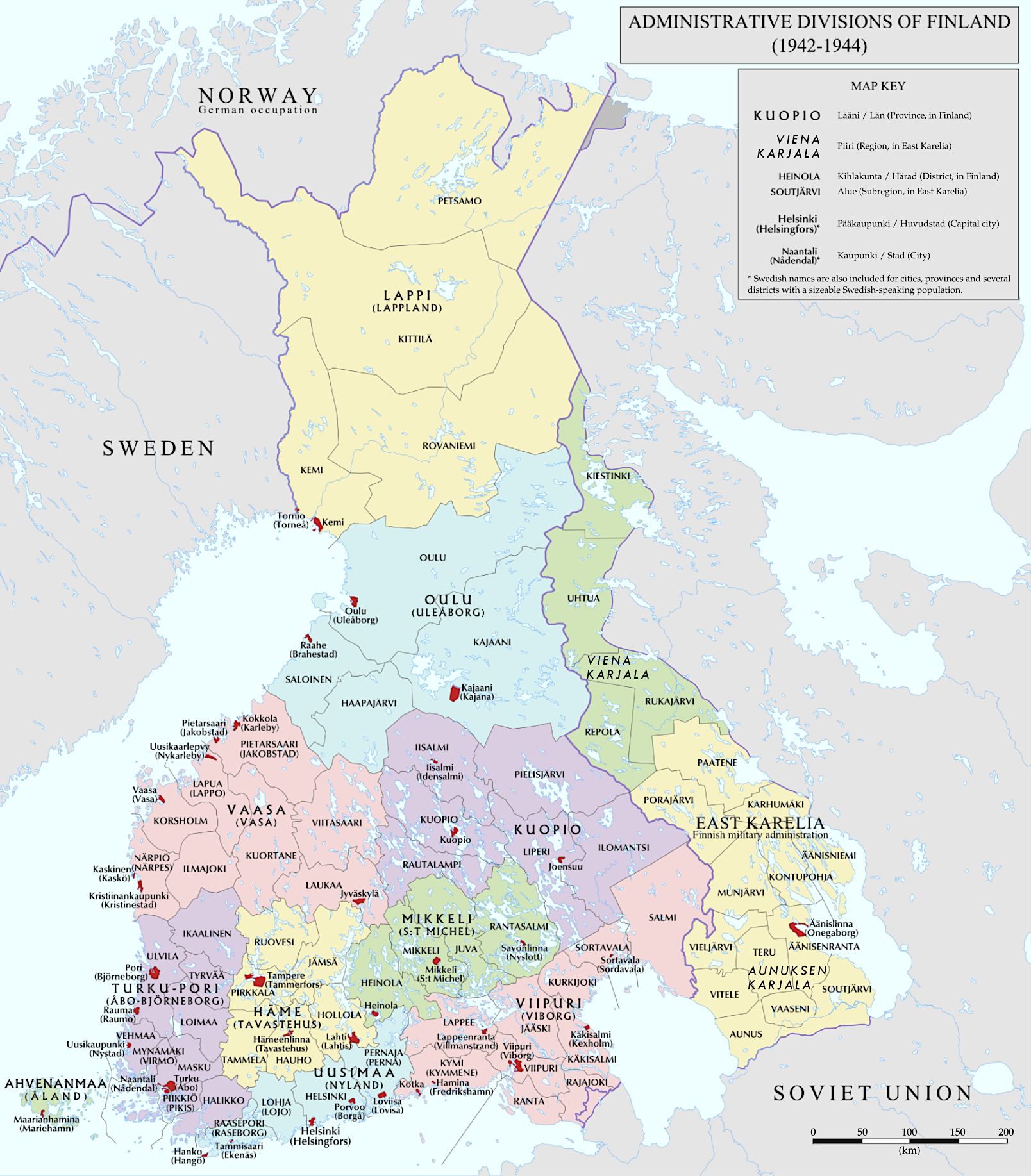
Administrative map of Finland in 1942-1944 (including East Karelia)

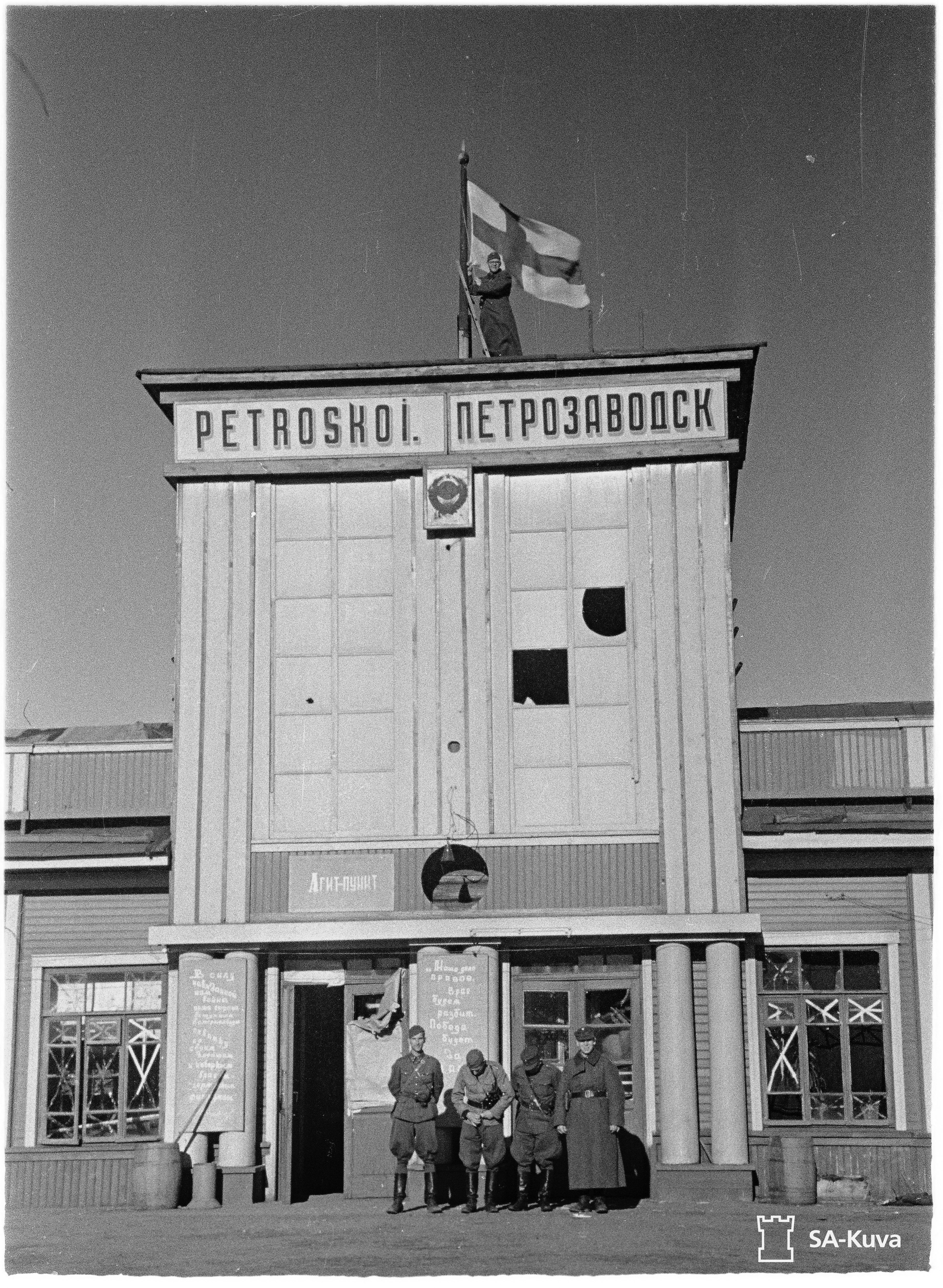
Finns in Petrozavodsk in 1941

The military administration was established on the order of the Commander-in-Chief, and was mainly under the control of the Army, not the Finnish government. It was originally divided into three districts ("piiri"), which were further divided into sub-regions ("alue"). The military administration used exclusively Finnish-Karelian place names (Russian names are given in parentheses).

List of the administrative divisions of East Karelia:

- Aunus (Olonets) district
  - City of Äänislinna/Onegaborg (Petrozavodsk)
  - Aunus (Olonets)
  - Vitele (Vidlitsa)
  - Vieljärvi (Vedlozero)
  - Kontupohja (Kondopoga)
  - Munjärvi (Munozero)
  - Teru/Prääsä (Pryazha)
  - Soutjärvi (Shyoltozero)
  - Vaaseni (Vazhiny)
  - Äänisniemi (Zaonezhye)
  - Äänisenranta (Prionezhsky)
- Maaselkä (Maselga) district
  - Rukajärvi (Rugozero)
  - Paatene (Padany)
  - Porajärvi (Porosozero)
  - Karhumäki (Medvezhyegorsk)
  - Repola (Reboly)
- Viena (Belomorye) district
  - Kiestinki (Kestenga)
  - Uhtua (Ukhta)

The Maaselkä district was abolished in late 1942. The Karhumäki, Paatene and Porajärvi sub-regions were transferred to Aunus district and the Repola and Rukajärvi sub-regions were transferred to Viena district.

=== Headquarters ===
The military administration was originally stationed in Mikkeli, Finland, where the general staff of the Finnish army was located. On 15 October, it was transferred to Joensuu, Finland, and finally on 15 November 1943, to Äänislinna (Petrozavodsk), KFSSR.

=== Military Commanders ===
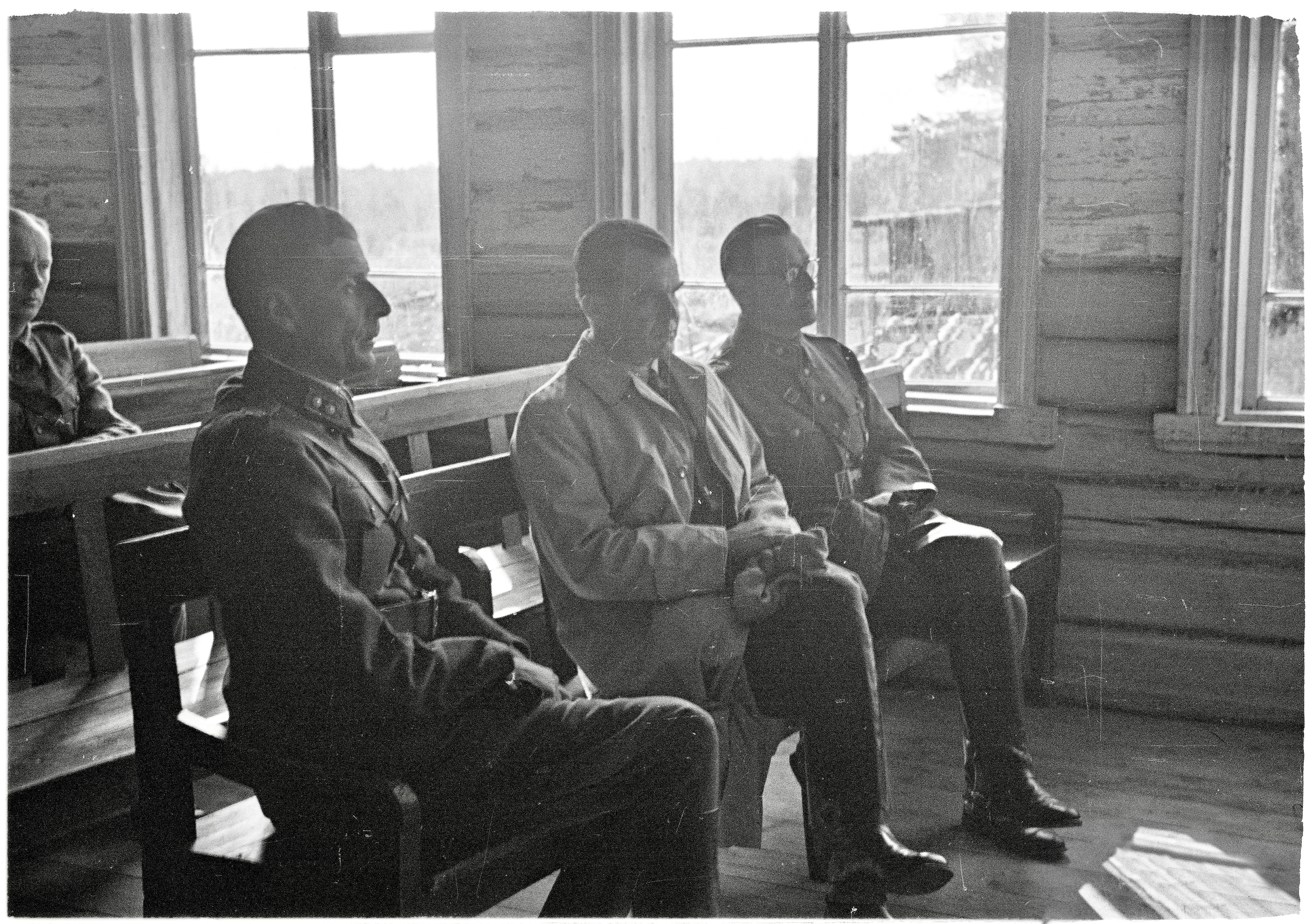
Prime minister Jukka Rangell (in the middle) also Major General of the Military Administration of East Karelia Johan Arajuuri (right) and lieutenant colonel Paloheimo (left), east Karelian village in the summer of 1942.

The first commander of the military administration was mining counselor and CEO of Enso-Gutzeit, Lieutenant Colonel Väinö Kotilainen. Kotilainen was followed by Colonel J. V. Arajuuri from 15 June 1942 to 19 August 1943, and finally by Col Olli Paloheimo who held the position to the end of the war.

On the staff of the military commander worked professor of administrative law Veli Merikoski, whose task was to ensure that the military administration functioned in accordance with international law. After the end of the Continuation War, Merikoski wrote a booklet on the military administration, describing it in an overtly positive light. This was done to help the Finnish cause in the coming peace negotiations.

=== Academic Karelia Society ===
Members of the Academic Karelia Society (AKS), a Finno-Ugric activist organization, held a dominating role in the military administration. During the Continuation War the "liberation" of Eastern Karelia had become the main focus point of AKS activities, and its members were highly influential in choosing the policies of the military administration in accordance with the organization's "Greater Finland" ideology. In the summer of 1941, over half of the initial higher leadership of the military administration were AKS members.

== Policies ==
The long-term goal of the military administration was to make it possible for Eastern Karelia to be permanently integrated to the Finnish state after the ultimate German victory over the Soviet Union. This was to be done by inspiring the native population's confidence towards the Finnish occupiers.

=== Fennicization ===
As most place names in Eastern Karelia had a historical Finnish or Karelian alternatives which were still in use in the KFSSR, extensive renaming was not necessary. The notable exception is Petroskoi (Petrozavodsk), which was deemed as sounding too "Russian", and was renamed Äänislinna, a literal Finnish translation of the name Onegaborg used in the Theatrum Orbis Terrarum of Abraham Ortelius. Although Finnish troops never reached Kemi (Kem) on the shores of the White Sea, this town was also to be renamed, as a town with an identical name already stood in Finnish Lapland. The new name was tentatively suggested to be Vienanlinna ("Castle of Viena"), a continuation of several Finnish cities and towns ending in suffix -linna (e.g. Hämeenlinna, Savonlinna).

Streets were to be named after prominent Finns and patriots (such as Mannerheim, Elias Lönnrot, Elias Simojoki and Paavo Talvela), and also after names featured in the Kalevala and the Kanteletar. The Karelian population was also discouraged from giving their children Slavic names.

=== Ethnic policies ===
The remaining population of Eastern Karelia was estimated to be under 85,000 in 1941, and consisted mainly of women, children and the elderly, while the pre-war population was about 300,000. The Finnish authorities further estimated that of the remaining 85,000, about half could be classified as "national"; that is, Karelians, Finns, Estonians, Ingrians, Vepsians and other smaller Finnic minorities considered "kindred peoples" (heimo). The majority of the population was defined as "non-national", with most being Russian or Ukrainian. The Finns encountered considerable challenges in dividing the population into these two groups, as linguistic and ethnic boundaries were not very apparent. Ultimately, the division was based on ethnic principles (sometimes expressing somewhat pseudo-scientific anthropological theories), and thus monolingual Russian-speaking Karelians and children from multinational families were usually classified as "national". The long-term goal of this pursued policy was to expel the "non-national" part of the population to German-occupied Russia after the war had reached a victorious conclusion.

=== Education and propaganda ===
Finnish propaganda directed at the Karelian population focused on pan-Finnicism, presented the occupiers as liberators, and also tried to encourage antagonism between the Karelians and Russians. The main propaganda tools of the military administration were the newspaper Vapaa Karjala ("Free Karelia") and Aunus Radio.

School attendance was obligatory for 7- to 15-year-old children classified as "national" in ethnicity. The language of instruction was Finnish and the teaching had a heavy focus on Finnish nationalistic and religious themes. If the children were monolingual Russian or Veps speakers, with the latter language differing considerably from Finnish, Karelian-speaking children were used as translators. By the end of 1942, 110 elementary schools were opened, with an attendance of over 10,000 children.

One of the aims of the military administration was the revival of religious observation, which had been completely repressed under Soviet rule. The central idea of this policy was to bolster anti-communist feelings among the "nationals".

=== Planned population transfers ===
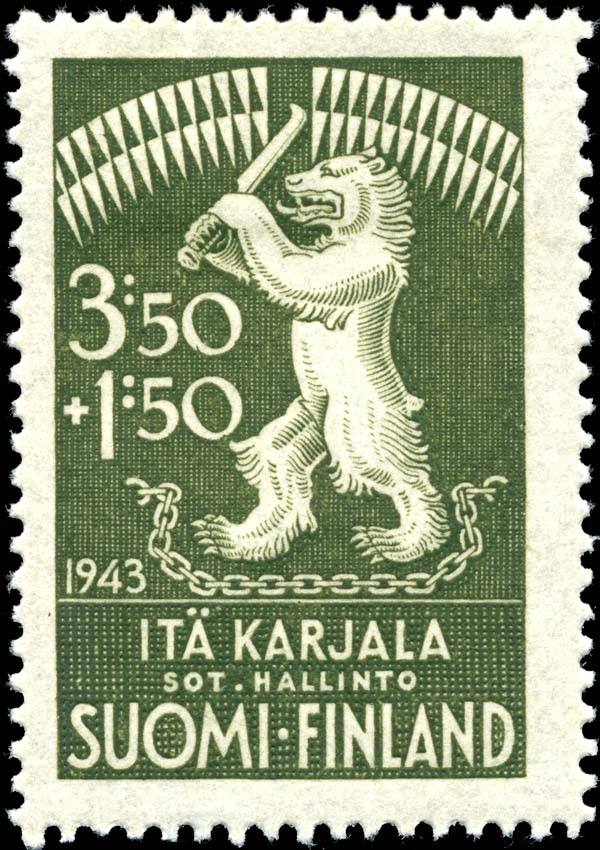
In 1943, the Finnish Post Office issued its own stamp for the occupation administration of Eastern Karelia.

Suffering from severe underpopulation, especially after the planned expulsion of the "non-national" ethnic groups, the Finns theorized several possible ways to repopulate the region. Most suggestions revolved around the re-settlement of certain Finnic minorities of Russia. The Karelians of Tver, who had escaped Swedish and Lutheran rule from the County of Kexholm and Ingria after the Ingrian War and the Treaty of Stolbovo of 1617 were especially considered, as the Soviet Census of 1926 had counted them as numbering over 140,000, making the Karelian population of Tver more numerous than the Karelians in the KFSSR itself. The transfer was not, however, possible before Finnish and German fronts reached each other on the River Svir, which never happened during the war.

The other main group intended to be settled in Eastern Karelia was the Ingrian Finns of the Leningrad Oblast, who according to the 1926 census numbered c. 115,000. However, during Stalin's purges tens of thousands of Ingrians had perished or were transferred to other parts of the Soviet Union, and in 1941 the Ingrians of Leningrad probably numbered only c. 80,000–90,000. In the autumn of 1941, Western and Central Ingria were occupied by the advancing German forces and placed under German military administration. Because Ingria was to be reserved for German colonization according to the Generalplan Ost (Ingermanland), the German and Finnish authorities agreed on a treaty which stated that Ingria was to be totally emptied of Finns and other Finnic minorities, mainly Votes and Izhorians. This treaty was implemented during March 1943 to the summer of 1944, when over 64,000 people were transferred from Ingria to Finland. The Ingrians remaining areas still under the control of the Red Army (c. 20,000–30,000) were deported to Siberia during the winter of 1942–1943. After the Moscow Armistice, some 55,000 Ingrians were repatriated to the Soviet Union, but were not allowed to return to their homes in the Leningrad Oblast before the 1950s. Around 7,000 to 8,000 Ingrians moved from Finland to Sweden to escape the Soviet authorities.

Other discussed sources for East Karelian settlers included the Finnish immigrants of America and Canada, Finnic Soviet prisoners of war in German captivity, Eastern Karelian refugees currently living in Finland, and Finnish war veterans. Land redistribution was to favor those without farms or land, disabled veterans who were still capable of working, former NCOs, border jägers and soldiers distinguished in battle.

=== Internment and labor camps ===
At the beginning of the Finnish occupation of Karelia, over 20,000 of the local ethnic Russians (almost half of them) were placed in internment and labor camps. At the end of 1941 this number rose to 24,000. Later prisoners were gradually released and then transferred to empty villages. However, their movement was controlled as they had red clearance, while "national" people had green clearance. Furthermore, ethnic Russians did not have permission to travel to Finland.

Living in the Finnish camps was harsh as 4,000–7,000 of the civil prisoners died, mostly from hunger during the spring and summer of 1942 due to the failed harvest of 1941. Also segregation in education and medical care between Karelians and Russians created resentment among the Russian population. These actions made many local ethnic Russian people support the partisan attacks.

== Planned future expansion ==
In a conversation held on 27 November 1941 with the Finnish Foreign Minister Witting, Hitler proposed that the new Finnish border should run from the Kola Peninsula to the Svir, and in the case Leningrad was razed to the ground as originally planned, to the River Neva. In Finland this theoretical border was sometimes referred to as Kolmen kannaksen raja ("the Border of Three Isthmuses", referring to the Karelian Isthmus, Olonets Isthmus and the White Sea Isthmus). The exact border of the White Sea Isthmus was left undefined during the war, but Alfred Rosenberg, head of the Reich Ministry for the Occupied Eastern Territories (RMfdbO), held that Finland should annex the whole KFSSR. The most eastward suggestion discussed among the Finnish officer corps before the war drew the line from Nimenga in the Arkhangelsk Oblast to the Pudozhsky District on Lake Onega. Professor Gerhard von Mende (RMfdbO) had consulted Finnish far-right activist Erkki Räikkönen on Finland's "natural" eastern borders, and sent to Rosenberg a memorandum suggesting that the northeastern border between Finland and Germany should run along the Northern Dvina River (Finnish: Vienanjoki) near Arkangelsk.

The Kola Peninsula was to be de jure a part of Finland, but the nickel deposits of the region were to be exploited jointly with Germany. Jalmari Jaakkola estimated in Die Ostfrage Finnlands that some 200,000 Russians had to be expelled from the region, leaving the peninsula with a population of c. 20,000 Finns, Samis and Karelians.
