= Pirinen =

Pirinen is a Finnish surname. Notable people with the surname include:

- Joakim Pirinen (born 1961), Swedish illustrator
- Jonna Pirinen (born 1982), Finnish singer-songwriter
- Juha Pirinen (born 1991), Finnish footballer
- Juho Pirinen (born 1995), Finnish ice skater
- Kauko Pirinen (1915–1999), Finnish historian
