= Comodoro Rivadavia =

- City and Port
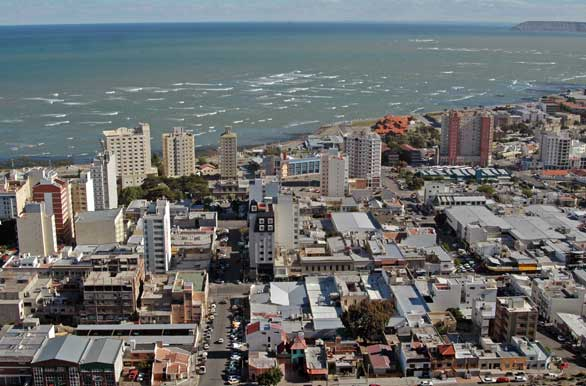
- Downtown Comodoro Rivadavia

- Seal
- Nicknames: Capital Nacional del Petróleo.; Capital Nacional del viento.
- Motto: A city with energy.
- Location within Chubut Location within Argentina
- Coordinates: 45°51′53″S 67°28′51″W
- Country: Argentina
- Province: Chubut
- Department: Escalante Department
- Founded: 1901

Government
  - Intendant: Othar Macharashvili (PJ)

Area
  - Total: 548.2 km^{2} (211.7 sq mi)
- Elevation: 61 m (200 ft)

Population (2022)
  - Total: 201,854
  - Density: 368.2/km^{2} (953.7/sq mi)
- Time zone: UTC−3 (ART)
- Post code: 9000
- Climate: BSk
- Website: Official Website

Comodoro Rivadavia (Spanish pronunciation: [komoˈðoɾo ɾiβaˈðaβja]), often shortened to Comodoro (/ˌkɒməˈdɔːroʊ/ KOM-ə-DOR-oh), is a city in the Patagonian province of Chubut in southern Argentina, located on the San Jorge Gulf, an inlet of the Atlantic Ocean, at the foot of the Chenque Hill. Comodoro Rivadavia is the most important city of the San Jorge Basin, and is the largest city in Chubut as well as the largest city south of the southern 45th parallel.

The city is often referred to simply as Comodoro. It was at one time the capital of the Comodoro Rivadavia Territory, which existed from 1943 to 1955. The territory was a part of Chubut before and after its creation, and the city became the capital of the Escalante Department. It had a population of 137,061 at the 2001 census [INDEC], and grew to 182,631 by the 2010 census. Comodoro Rivadavia is a commercial and transportation center for the surrounding region, the largest city of Chubut, and an important export point for a leading Argentine petroleum district. A 1,770 km pipeline conveys natural gas from Comodoro Rivadavia to Buenos Aires.

Founded by decree on February 23, 1901, as a port for the inland settlement of Sarmiento, the first settler was Francisco Pietrobelli. Early settlers included Boers escaping British rule in South Africa, as well as Welsh settlers. The town was named in honour of shipping minister Martín Rivadavia, a proponent of the development of Southern Argentina. It has been prosperous since 1907, when a drilling crew searching for water struck oil at a depth of 539 meters.

The city is the home of the main faculty of the National University of Patagonia San Juan Bosco. Its cathedral is the seat of the Diocese of Comodoro Rivadavia, of which the Bishop is, since 2005, Virginio Domingo Bressanelli. The Cathedral is dedicated to San Juan Bosco, the only cathedral in the world dedicated to the founder of the Salesian Order. It was inaugurated in 1979, although the crypt itself had been dedicated in 1949.

Rada Tilly is a beach resort and now suburb 12 km south of Comodoro. The National Museum of Petroleum is located in the General Mosconi neighbourhood 3 km north of central Comodoro Rivadavia. It was opened in 1987 by the state-owned oil company YPF.

Comodoro Rivadavia is served by General Enrique Mosconi International Airport (Airport Code CRD/SAVC) with daily flights to Buenos Aires and many other Patagonian cities, as it is the main hub of LADE. An area control centre is located here, providing enroute air traffic control services over southern Argentina and the Falkland Islands.

== History ==
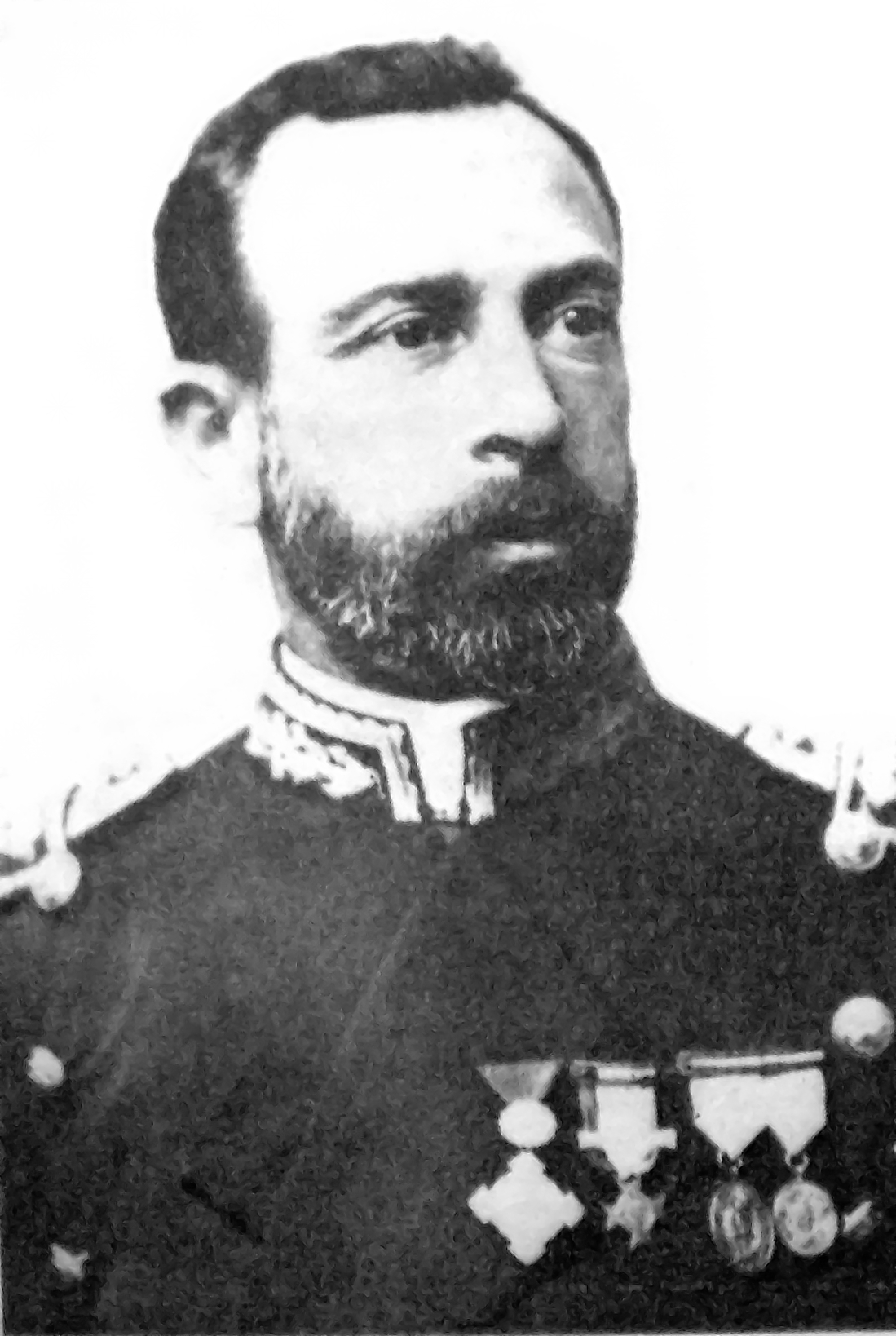
Commodore Martín Rivadavia

The urgency to define short routes to transport products from Colonia Sarmiento and bring them to that village created the necessity of a port in the area of San Jorge Gulf. This necessity made possible the foundation of Comodoro Rivadavia, today capital of petroleum in Argentina. The first governor of Gobernación Nacional del Chubut was Colonel Luis Jorge Fontana, who traveled around the whole extension attributed to Chubut commanding a numerous group of Welsh immigrants in 1885. American researcher Junius Bird and Finnish geographer Väinö Auer confirmed the existence of the Tehuelche people, who lived in the area of Rada Tilly some 9000 years ago. This information was confirmed by Father Brea, who some years ago contributed to this theory with the discovery of utensils and human remains near Rada Tilly.

It is widely known that the Tehuelche, who came from the north of Patagonia during the warm summer, used to make camp where Rada Tilly is today. The English navigator Robert FitzRoy was the first to mention its existence in a navigation chart.

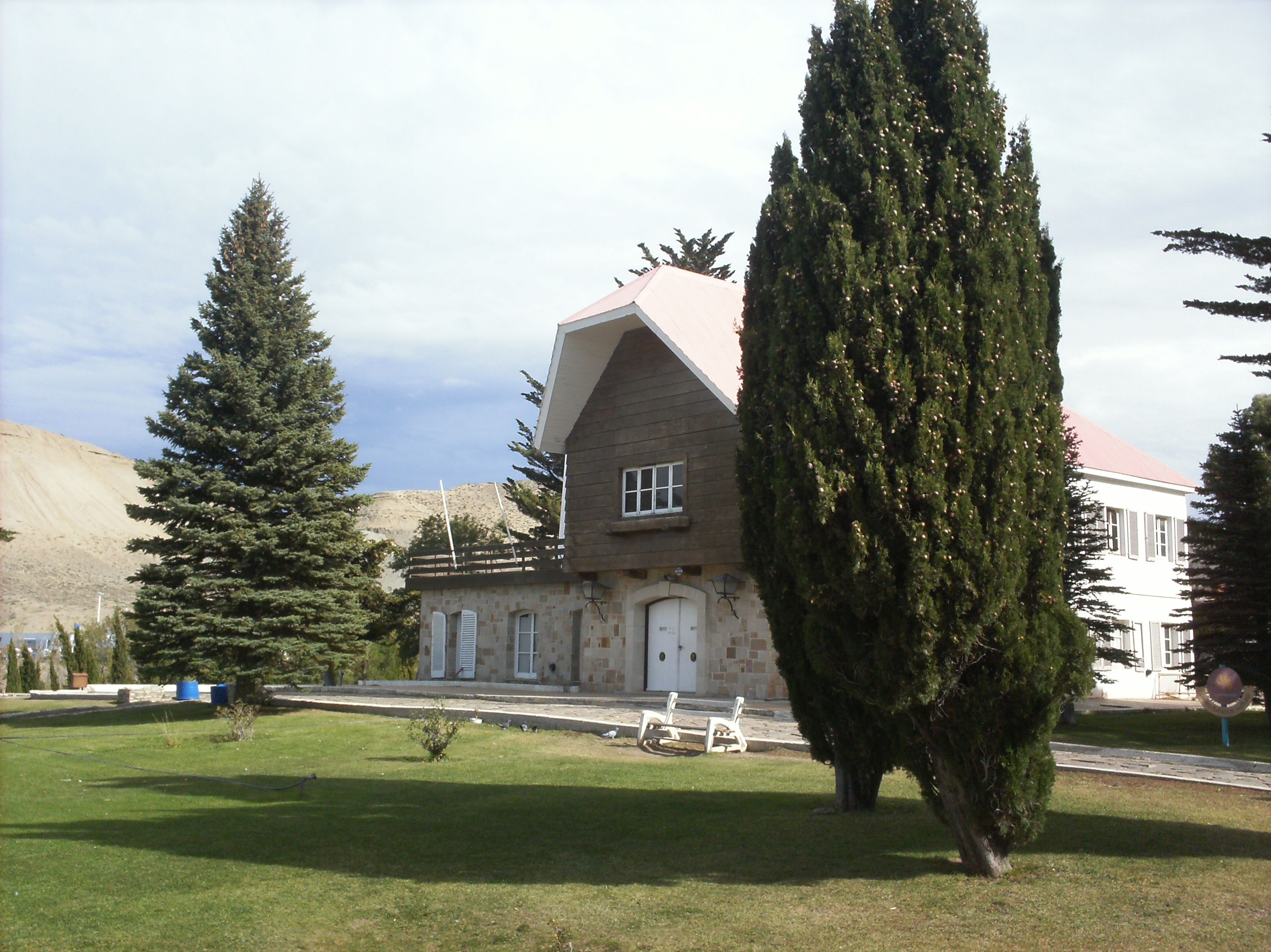
The Huergo Chalet, built in 1919, hosted numerous official gatherings

On March 10, 1889, Francisco Pietrobelli, accompanied by the Tehuelche man Sainajo and Marcelo Pereira, came to Rada Tilly following FitzRoy's navigation charts in search of an anchoring place to set up a deep-water port where deep-draft ships could stop to supply the flourishing Colonia Sarmiento.

The corvette La Argentina, commanded by Commodore Martín Rivadavia, arrived near Mount Chenque in an exploratory mission and settled an anchorage place now called Kilometro 5, Caleta Córdova or Punta Borjas. Pietrobelli completed the construction of the first storage shed on June 26 in the place indicated years before by a Schinus molle trunk. Commodore Rivadavia became the first Argentine marine to anchor his corvette in Rada Tilly in March 1891, while he was reconnoitering the area to control the displacement of the Chilean Army in the Argentine south. The village was named after the Spanish marine Francisco Everardo Tilly y Paredes, who during 1794 and 1795 gave combat and defeated the Portuguese army at the Rio Plata.

The settlement was renamed Comodoro Rivadavia on February 23, 1901 by decree of the national government, in homage to the illustrious marine, grandson of the great statesman and first Argentine president, Bernardino Rivadavia.

=== Discovery of oil ===
In 1903 six hundred Afrikaner families arrived in Argentina following the loss of the Second Boer War and were given farming land in the lands around Comodoro Rivadavia. However, due to a shortage of water, they had to bring water in by ox wagon with the lack of it being a big impediment to the development of the settlement. At the Afrikaners' insistence drilling began in 1907 in an effort to look for water but instead they struck oil. Although much of the oil was discovered on land given to Afrikaans settlers, they could not benefit directly from the discovery due to Argentinian law which decrees that all mineral deposits belong to the state. Therefore, most of the town's Afrikaans settlers moved on to Sarmiento and surrounding regions to set up farms there.

The discovery of oil in 1907 boosted economic growth in Comodoro Rivadavia. By the end of 1919, most of the 1,719 workers were given accommodation in small metal sheet houses without any heating or electric light with temperatures below zero and winds near 100 km/h. The establishment of Yacimientos Petrolíferos Fiscales (YPF) in 1922 led to the development of the town, further accelerated in the late 1950s by President Arturo Frondizi's oil campaign to foster the installation of numerous foreign companies. The city evolved around this industry, and even today when this panorama has changed substantially, it is still called the "National Oil Capital."

The beach village Rada Tilly was founded on July 24, 1948, and today is an important hub for tourism in Argentina. Oil production has begun to decline in quantity but the area has been turning its attention to wind power. Windmills on Cerro Chenque and surrounding hills comprise South America's largest wind farm and provide 20% of Comodoro's energy needs.

=== Floods of 2025 ===
On March 22, 2025, a rainstorm beginning near 8:30 a.m. brought an estimated 15 millimetres of rain to Comodoro Rivadavia and coincided with the 9:00 a.m. high tide. The resulting delay in drainage flooded several areas, while nine families received assistance and no evacuations were reported. A planned underground stormwater system from the intersection of Roca and Nación avenues to the coast would measure four metres wide and three metres high.

== Climate ==
Comodoro Rivadavia features a cold semi-desert climate (BSk) according to the Köppen climate classification, and it has a subtropical climate — all 12 monthly means >6°C as per John Griffiths — and is one of the southernmost locations in the world to have one. While the city receives just over 250 mm of rain annually, its relatively low evapotranspiration rate causes it to fall under this climate, as opposed to the arid (desert) category. Summer is warm to hot and dry with an average temperature of 19.7 °C (67.5 °F) in January. Winter is mild with an average temperature of 6.8 °C (44.2 °F) in July. Precipitation is low, though the winter months receive more precipitation than in summer.

Climate data for Comodoro Rivadavia (General Enrique Mosconi International Airport) 1991–2020, extremes 1931–present
Month	Jan	Feb	Mar	Apr	May	Jun	Jul	Aug	Sep	Oct	Nov	Dec	Year
Record high °C (°F)	40.2 (104.4)	40.2 (104.4)	39.2 (102.6)	31.6 (88.9)	26.3 (79.3)	22.6 (72.7)	22.8 (73.0)	24.7 (76.5)	29.7 (85.5)	32.0 (89.6)	35.5 (95.9)	38.6 (101.5)	40.2 (104.4)
Mean daily maximum °C (°F)	26.3 (79.3)	25.1 (77.2)	22.7 (72.9)	18.8 (65.8)	14.6 (58.3)	11.3 (52.3)	11.0 (51.8)	13.1 (55.6)	15.6 (60.1)	18.9 (66.0)	22.2 (72.0)	24.7 (76.5)	18.7 (65.7)
Daily mean °C (°F)	19.8 (67.6)	18.8 (65.8)	16.5 (61.7)	13.3 (55.9)	10.0 (50.0)	7.3 (45.1)	6.7 (44.1)	8.2 (46.8)	10.2 (50.4)	13.1 (55.6)	15.9 (60.6)	18.3 (64.9)	13.2 (55.8)
Mean daily minimum °C (°F)	13.5 (56.3)	12.8 (55.0)	11.0 (51.8)	8.5 (47.3)	5.7 (42.3)	3.3 (37.9)	2.7 (36.9)	3.9 (39.0)	5.2 (41.4)	7.4 (45.3)	9.9 (49.8)	12.2 (54.0)	8.0 (46.4)
Record low °C (°F)	3.9 (39.0)	2.6 (36.7)	0.3 (32.5)	−4.1 (24.6)	−4.9 (23.2)	−8.5 (16.7)	−7.6 (18.3)	−5.4 (22.3)	−5.7 (21.7)	−1.8 (28.8)	0.2 (32.4)	2.0 (35.6)	−8.5 (16.7)
Average precipitation mm (inches)	10.7 (0.42)	17.3 (0.68)	27.7 (1.09)	31.8 (1.25)	33.5 (1.32)	37.2 (1.46)	21.4 (0.84)	19.3 (0.76)	19.8 (0.78)	12.6 (0.50)	14.3 (0.56)	12.5 (0.49)	258.1 (10.16)
Average precipitation days (≥ 0.1 mm)	2.7	3.9	4.6	4.2	6.1	6.3	5.9	6.1	6.5	4.7	4.2	3.8	58.8
Average snowy days	0.0	0.0	0.0	0.1	0.3	2.0	2.3	0.8	0.9	0.2	0.0	0.0	6.6
Average relative humidity (%)	39.0	44.8	48.4	51.0	57.8	59.0	57.9	54.3	51.8	46.3	41.9	39.8	49.3
Mean monthly sunshine hours	303.8	259.9	229.4	189.0	148.8	129.0	142.6	167.4	195.0	244.9	276.0	282.1	2,567.9
Mean daily sunshine hours	9.8	9.2	7.4	6.3	4.8	4.3	4.6	5.4	6.5	7.9	9.2	9.1	7.0
Percentage possible sunshine	51	55	47	45	43	43	41	42	42	47	53	49	47
Average ultraviolet index	10	9	6	3	1	1	1	2	4	6	8	10	5
Source 1: Servicio Meteorológico Nacional (UV 1997-2001; 2004-2019), NOAA (percent sun 1961–1990)
Source 2: Meteo Climat (record highs and lows) Secretaria de Mineria (November record high, and April, May, July, and August record lows only),

== Population ==
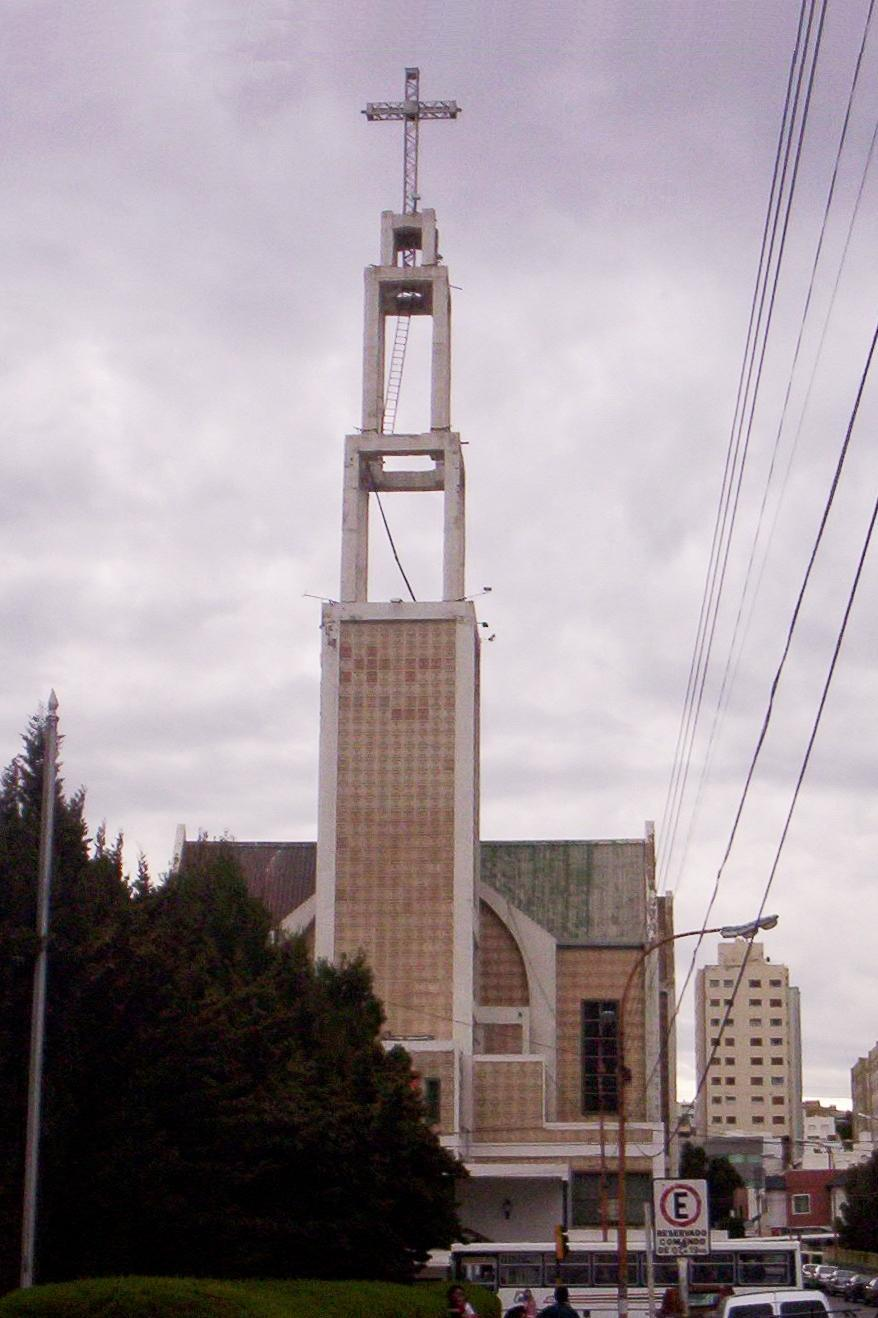
San Juan Bosco Cathedral

Comodoro Rivadavia had a population of 182,631 inhabitants in 2010, compared to 135,632 in 2001 and 124,104 in 1991. The city grew by about a third between 2001 and 2010, compared to an increase of 9.2% between 1991 and 2001. The national average was of around 11% in both periods, representing a notable acceleration in population growth for the city in comparison to Argentina. The city size places Comodoro Rivadavia as the 20th largest city of the country and the largest in South Patagonia, which goes from Chubut to Tierra del Fuego.

=== Urban areas ===
Comodoro Rivadavia is the biggest city to the south of the Colorado River. The city developed from the oil camps which evolved into neighbourhoods.

The city is divided into three main areas: North Area, South Area and Downtown Area.

The South Area is the most populated in the city. The neighbourhoods are: Jorge Newbery, San Martin, 1311 Viviendas, Cerro Solo, Ñaco, San Cayetano, Francisco Pietrobelli, Las Flores, La Floresta, Máximo Abasolo, Moure, Cordón Forestal, Quirno Costa, Maestro Isidro Quiroga, Juan XIII, San Isidro Labrador, 9 de Julio, 13 de Diciembre, Julio A. Roca, Juan Manuel de Pueyrredon, 30 de Octubre, LU4, Abel Amaya, Industrial, Stella Maris, Ceferino Namuncurá, Jose Fuchs, Balcón del Paraiso, Covipex, Rincón del Diablo, 311 Viviendas and Humberto Beghin.

The Downtown area is divided into: Centro, Loma and Civico neighbourhood.

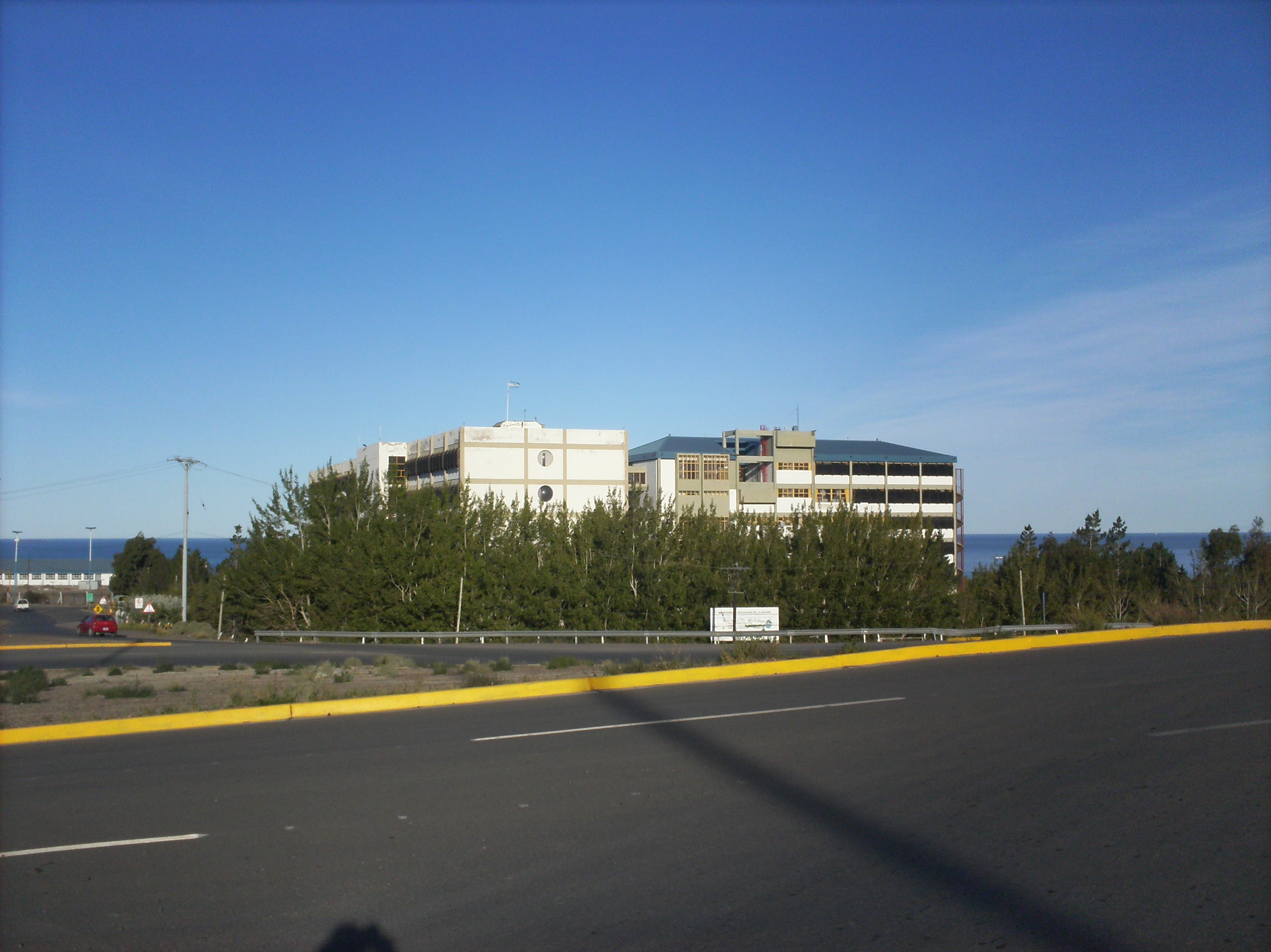
Campus of the National University of Patagonia San Juan Bosco

The Northern Area is divided into:

- 3rd Kilometre
- 4th Kilometre, home of National University of Patagonia San Juan Bosco.
- 5th Kilometre.
- 6th Kilometre, home of General Enrique Mosconi International Airport) and Petroleros Privados.
- 8th Kilometre.

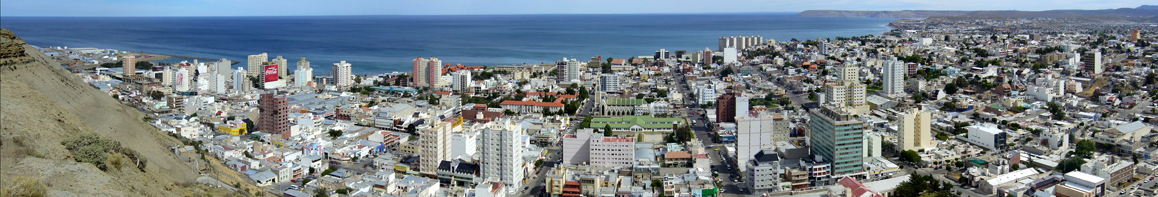
Panoramic view of the city.

== Economy ==
=== Industry and commerce ===
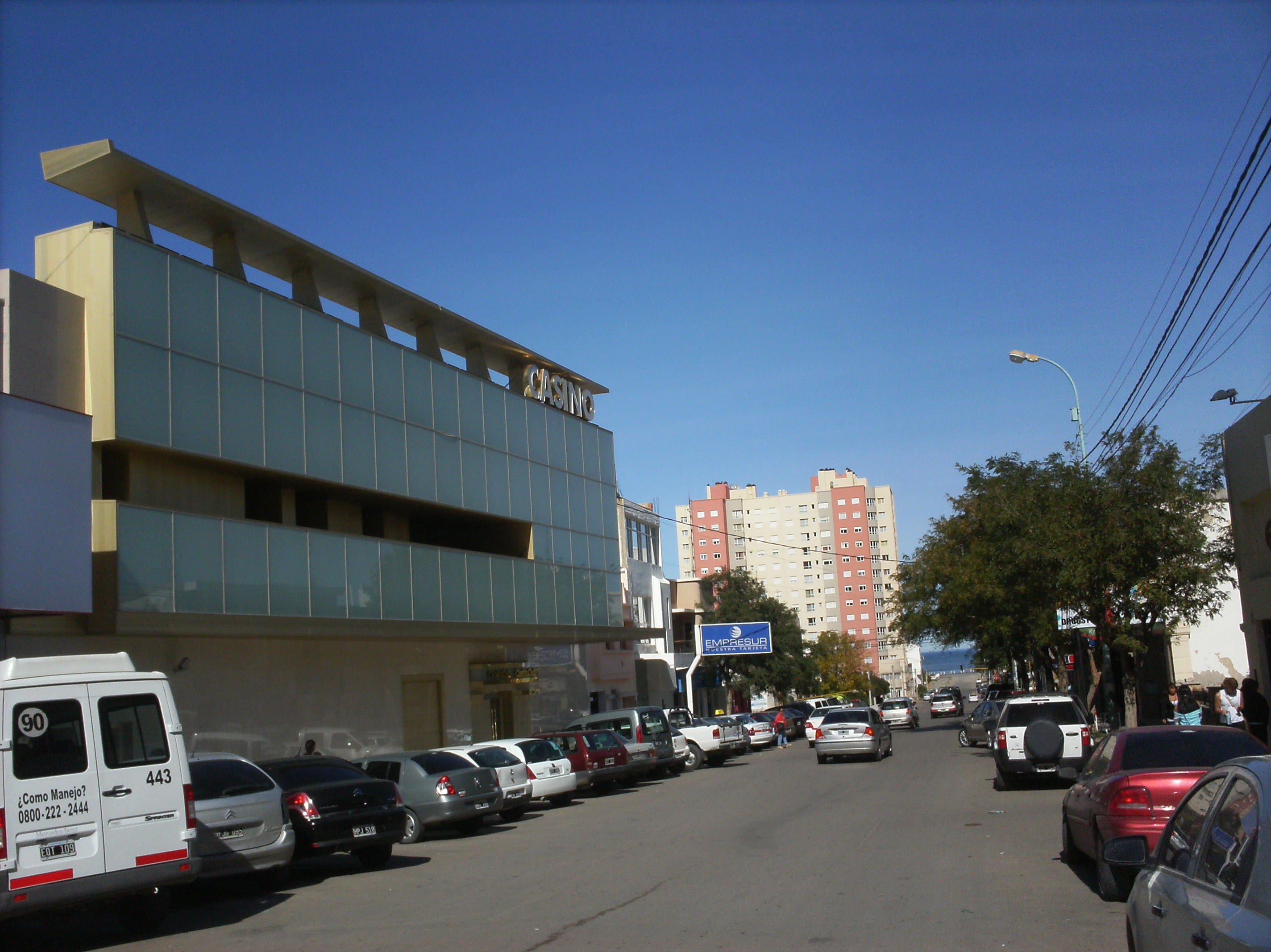
The Casino Club Comodoro, part of a growing tourism sector

The commercial and industrial activities of the city are the most important in the region. The main activities of the city are: production of chemical products, elaborated concrete, salter, fabrication of industrial houses, shipyard, metallurgical products, refrigerated products, industrial factories, casting, textile industry, blocks and bricks, and cement.

=== Oil industry ===
The oil production started in Chubut in 1907, when a drilling rig which was looking for water discovered oil instead. The Argentine oil industry started in Comodoro Rivadavia, and was facilitated by the 1886 National Mining Code (Codigo de Mineria de la Nación). This code established that the oil fields belonged to the State, and that they could also be exploited by the private sector by concession.

In 1922 YPF (Yacimientos Petrolíferos Fiscales), the first state-owned oil company in the world, was created by President Hipólito Yrigoyen's government. This company helped the society by improving the construction of houses, providing new jobs and health care. Engineer Enrique Mosconi was in charge of running the company. By 1933, 1,648 wells had been drilled in Comodoro Rivadavia; 88.9% of them were economically productive.

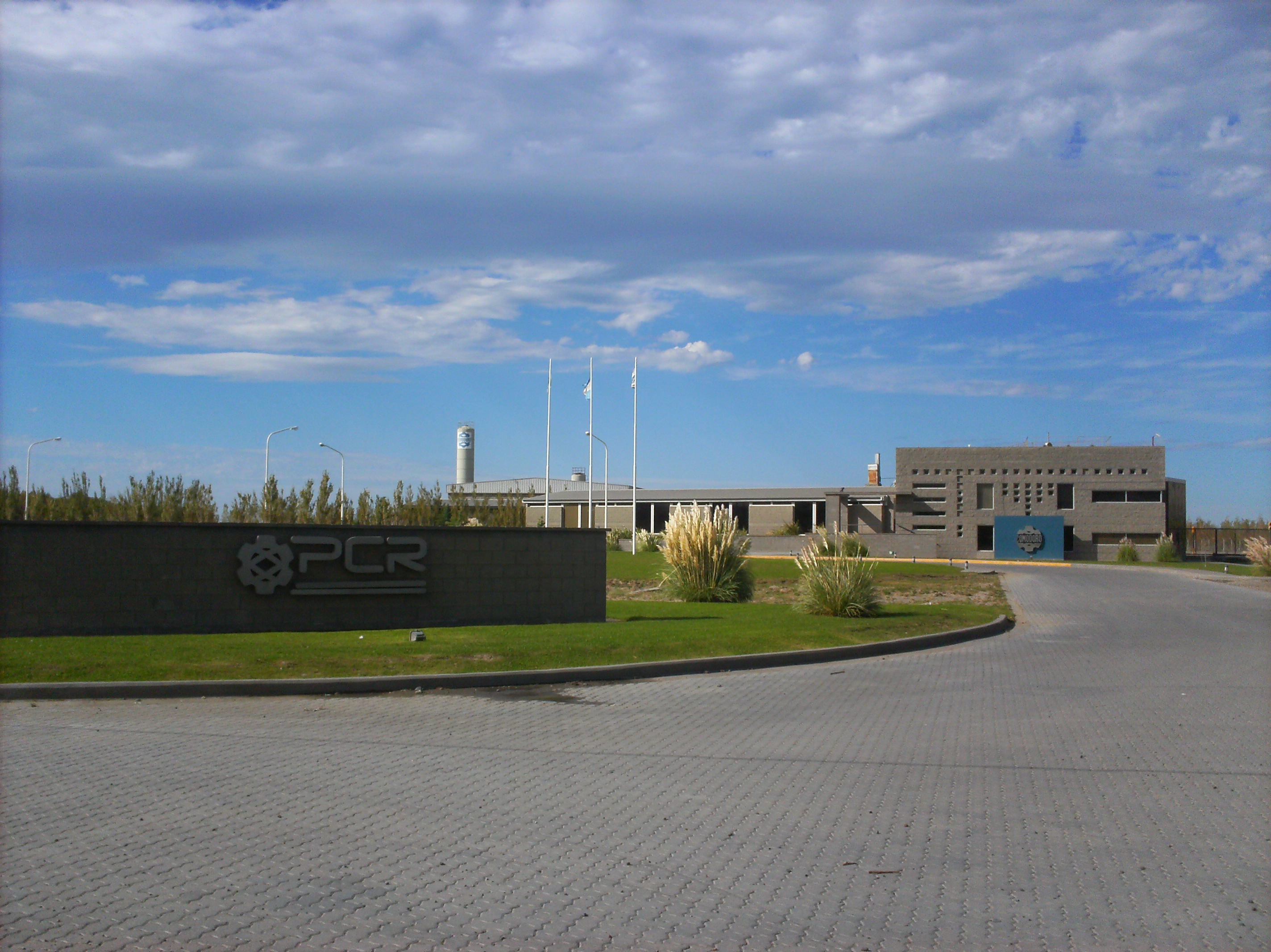
The PCR petrochemical company, a leading local employer

In 1935 the First Oil Law was passed. It established that the National and provincial States would receive as contribution the 12% of the Gross Product from all oil drilling, which is still in effect.

In 1958, Law Number 14,773 was signed by President Arturo Frondizi, establishing that the Government had exclusive ownership over all oil fields.

The most important oil fields discovered during the 60's were El Huemul and Piedra Clavada. At the beginning of the same decade twenty wells were drilled.

Between 1977 and 1986, 100 million m^{3} oil were drilled from San Jorge gulf, in the meantime the oil reserves reached 40 million m^{3}; in 1979 the San Jorge gulf production reached 10,124,022 m^{3} of oil.

Until 2001, 5,300 wells were drilled, of which 3,000 were economically productive. As a result of the exploratory activities developed during the century, the remaining reserves reach 182.017 million m^{3} of oil. San Jorge gulf is the leader in oil extraction. 46,000 m^{3} per day are extracted in the zone, representing 46% of total crude oil production in the nation.

== Geography ==
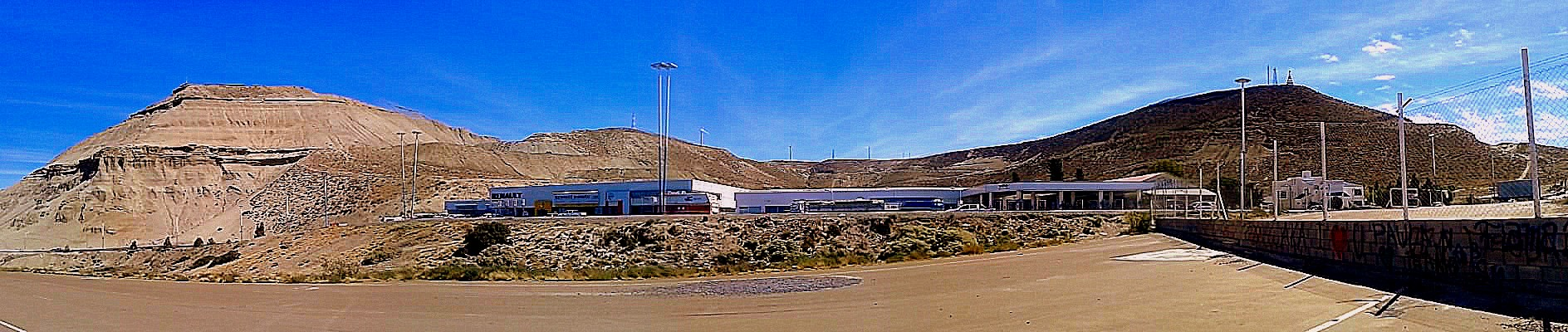
Viteaux and Chenque Hills, the city's most distinctive geographic features

Comodoro Rivadavia is situated in the south of Argentina in the province of Chubut, on the coast of San Jorge Gulf.

It was necessary to create a port in the area of San Jorge Gulf in order to have shorter routes for transporting products from and to the town of Sarmiento, situated 180 km away from the city of Comodoro Rivadavia.

=== Foundation and history ===
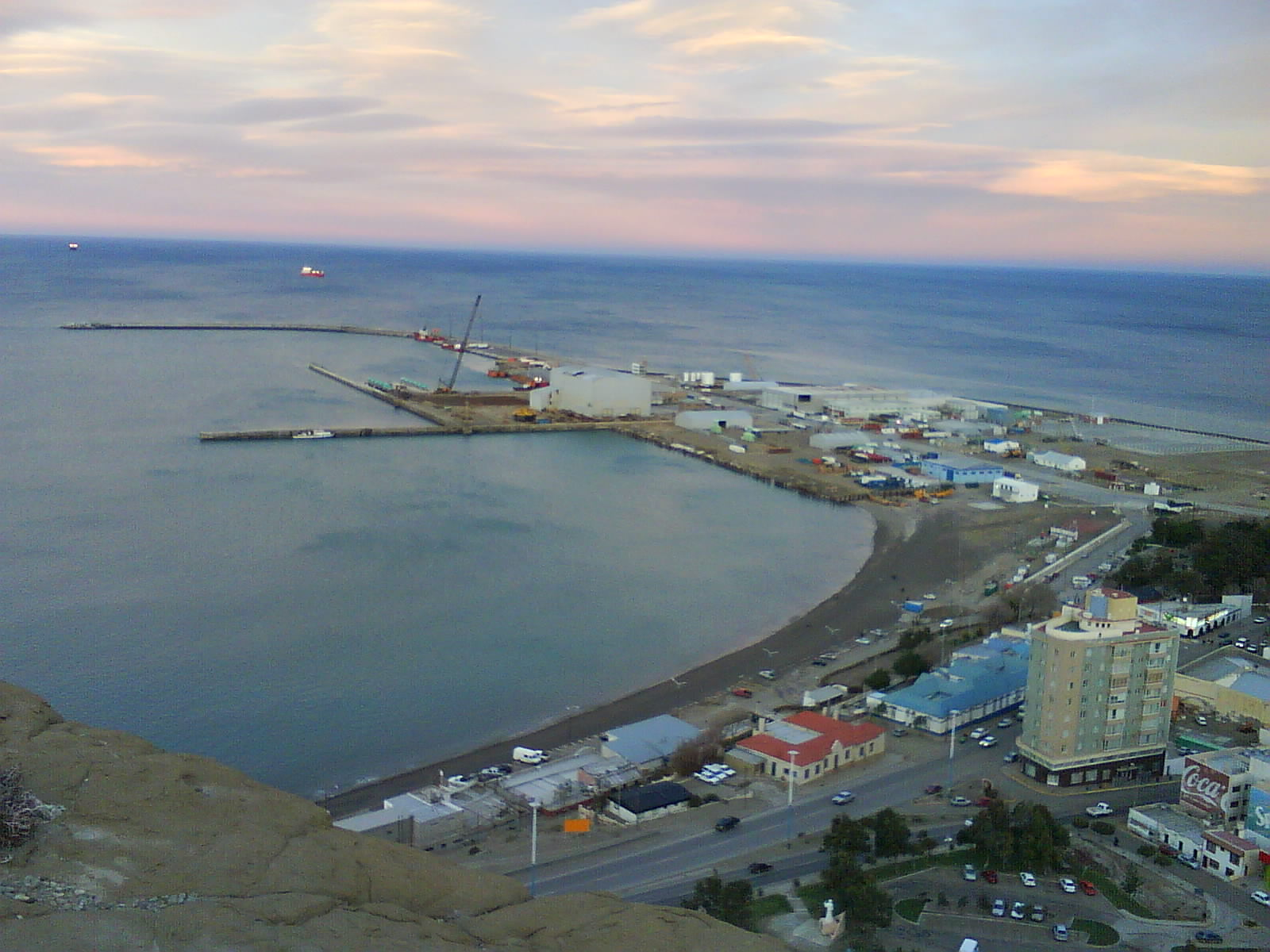
The Port Zone from Chenque Hill

Since 1908, the small and minor port Maciel received passengers and shipments that arrived at the city of Comodoro Rivadavia. It was built of wood and only could support small ships. In 1923, the construction of the port started. In 1926 the construction was stopped, but in 1928 it was resumed.

=== Facilities ===
The shipyard has two parallel industrial facilities of 70 meters long and 4 meters wide. This allows the repair and building of ships in a roofed space without the weather affecting the activity. The shipyard has three travelling cranes of 8 tons each. Works made in the shipyard include the building of eolic mill towers and oil buoys.

The port facilities include:

- The principal Port situated near the downtown. Its extreme point called Punta Borja, was designed to receive ships up to 181 meters length and 10 meters depth. The port has a pier of 216 meters long, which was built to meet the demand of the transportation of commodities, deep-sea fishing and naval repairs.
- Caleta Cordova's low tide pier is located in the north of Comodoro Rivadavia city, over the coast of Caleta Cordova's neighborhood. This pier meets the demand of artisan fishing.
- Repsol-YPF's pier, located in the south of General Mosconi neighbourhood, is used for unloading fuel. The total fuel unloaded is over 29,000 liters per month.
- Caleta Olivares's facilities are used to load crude oil. It has four mooring buoys and one bell buoy. The depth of this area is 9 meters.
- Caleta Cordova's facilities for loading crude oil include one charge buoy and four mooring buoys. These facilities located 5 kilometres (3.1 mi) away from the coast are used for mooring ships up to 100.000 tons and 11 meters depth.

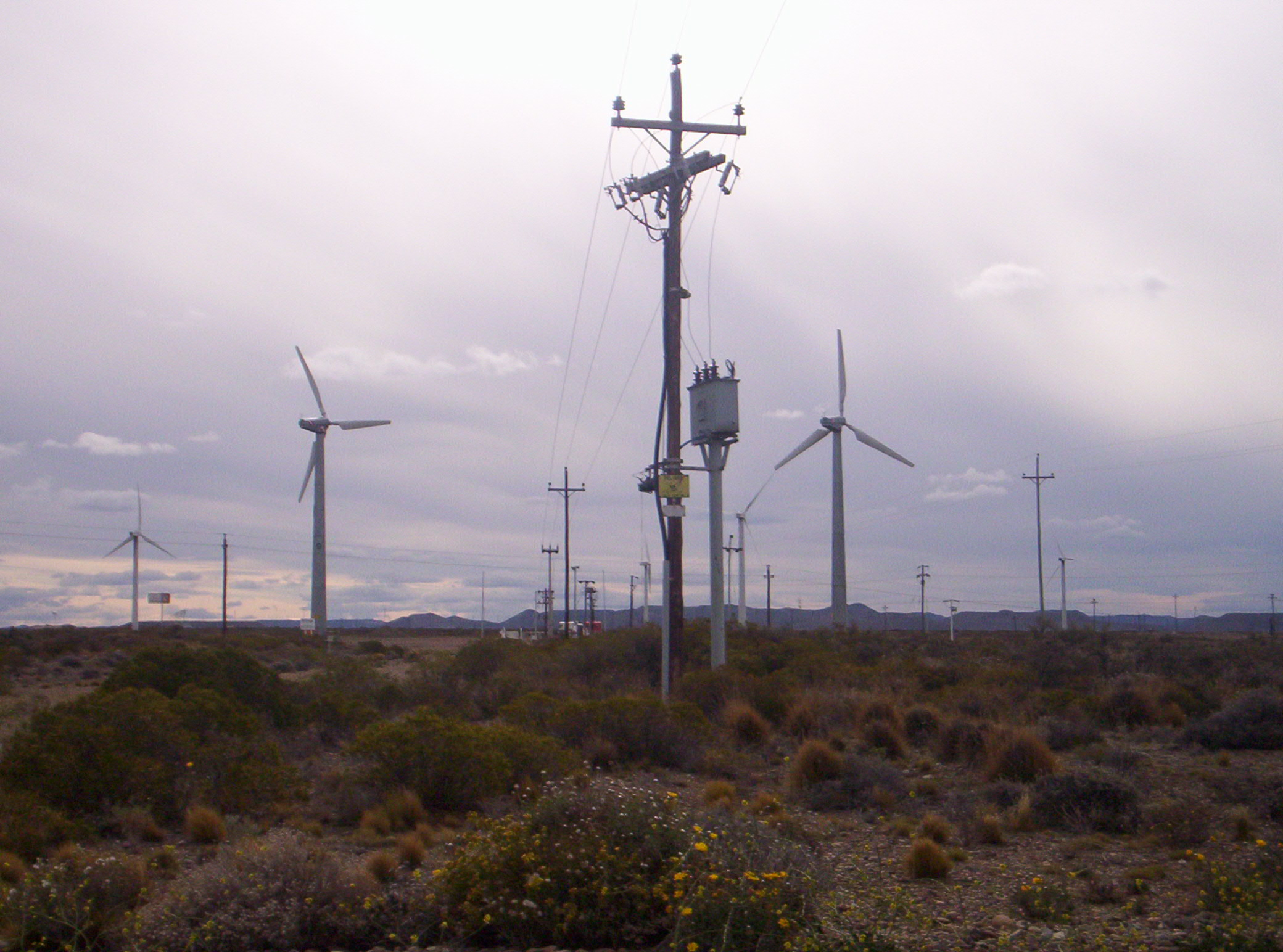
The Comodoro Rivadavia wind farm

=== Production of concrete ===
The city also is home to a factory that produces concrete, property of Petroquimica Comodoro Rivadavia S.A. It produces different types of concrete: Standard Portland, Puzolanic, BCA, ARI, bricklaying concrete Caltex, concrete for oil industry. The total production of concrete for the year 2002 was 228,000 tons.

=== Wind energy ===
The wind farm of Comodoro Rivadavia has a capacity of 18,820 kW with 26 generators, and is the most important in Latin America. Plans exist to connect it to the national energy grid, which could allow the sale of energy to other regions.

== Sports ==
The most important sports in the city of Comodoro Rivadavia are basketball, football and car racing, among others such as land yachting, judo, rugby and athletics.

Comodoro Rivadavia is the home of the basketball team Gimnasia y Esgrima (Comodoro Rivadavia). Other local basketball clubs are Nautico and Federacion Deportiva.

Map of a nearby track, Autódromo General San Martín

The most popular football clubs are CAI (Comisión de Actividades Infantiles), Huracán, which plays in the Argentine Tournament "B" and Club Atlético Jorge Newbery.

Comodoro Rivadavia also has a football league in which many teams participate; the principal teams are Jorge Newbery, Huracán and Petroquímica. There are other clubs such as Tiro Federal, Universitario, Ferroviario, Usma, Tiro Federal and Portugues, which are located in the First A League of Comodoro Rivadavia.

Land yachting has become very popular in the city and the beaches of Rada Tilly, together with the windy climate, are ideal to practise the sport.

The World Championship of Landyachting was held in 2008 in Rada Tilly.
