= Olli Paloheimo =

Finnish business executive, forester, officer and politician (1894–1974)

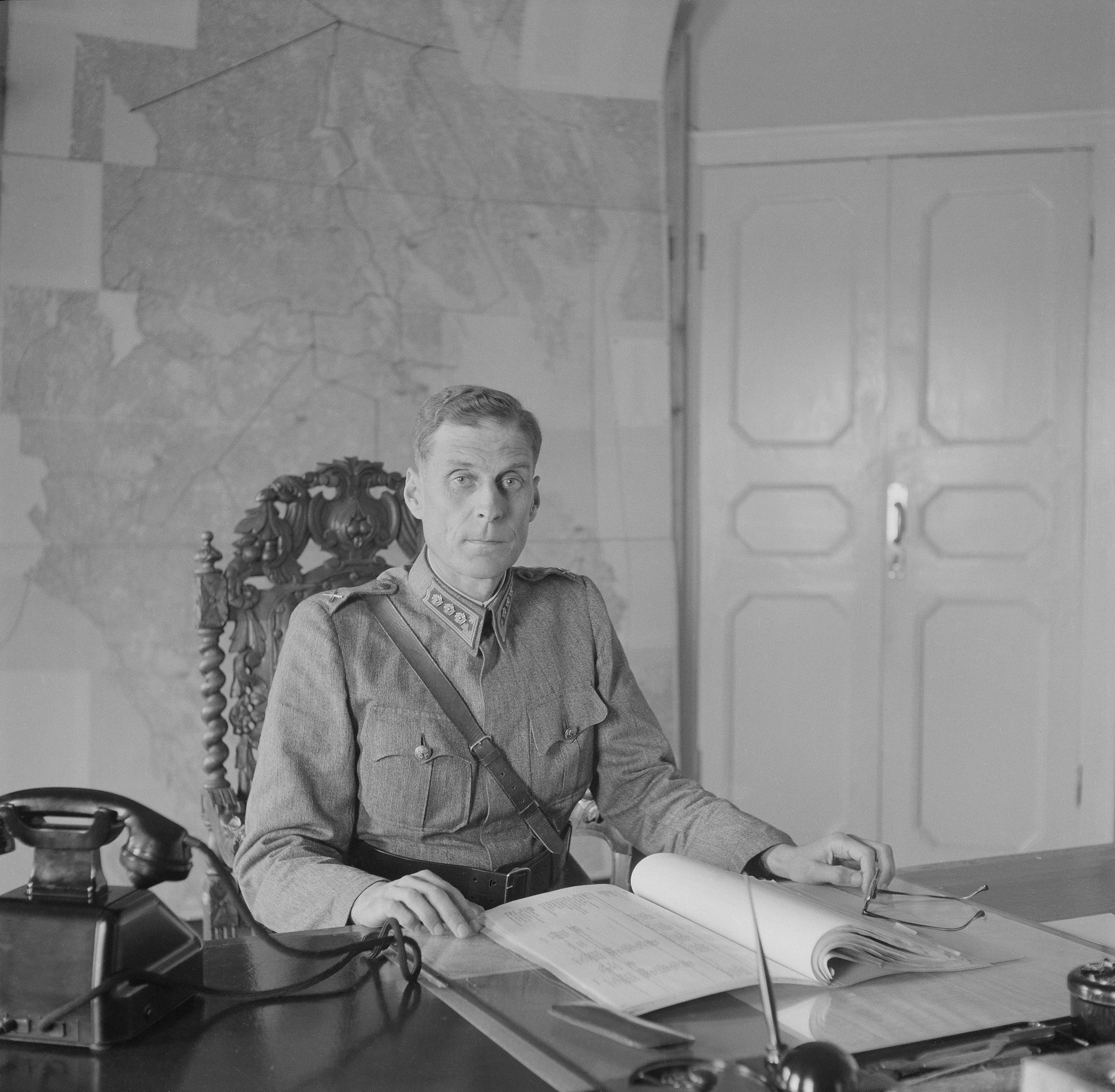
Olli Paloheimo at his desk in September 1943

Martti Olavi (Olli) Paloheimo (23 May 1894–7 November 1974; surname until 1906 Brander) was a Finnish business executive, forester, military officer and politician, born in Helsinki. He was a member of the National Coalition Party. He served as Deputy Minister of Finance from 8 August to 21 September 1944. In 1915, during World War I, Paloheimo travelled clandestinely to Germany under the assumed name of Martin Brand and joined the 27th Jäger Battalion of the Imperial German Army. He participated in battles on the Eastern Front against the Imperial Russian Army. In February 1918, he returned to Finland with the other Jägers and participated in the Finnish Civil War on the White side. During the Continuation War, he was the director of the Finnish military administration in Eastern Karelia from 1943 to 1944.
