= Finnlands Lebensraum =

1941 book

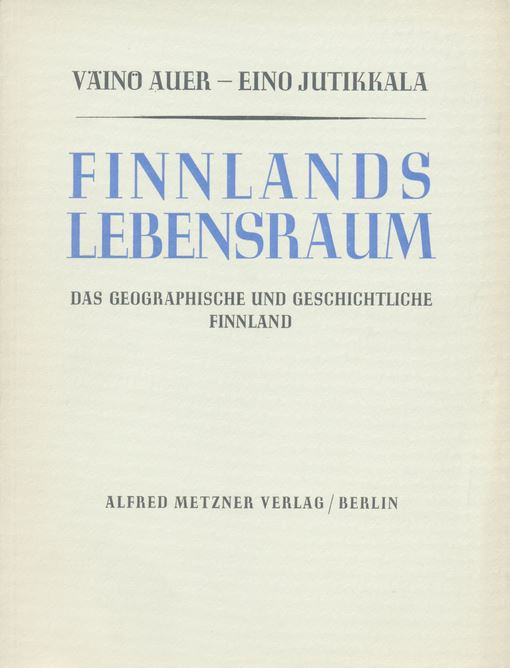
- Author: Väinö Auer; Eino Jutikkala; Kustaa Vilkuna
- Language: German
- Genre: Propaganda
- Publisher: Alfred Metzner Verlag, Berlin
- Publication date: 1941
- Publication place: Finland / Germany
- Pages: 154

Finnlands Lebensraum is a 1941 Finnish propaganda book that was published to support the Greater Finland ideology. It was written by the geographer Väinö Auer, the historian Eino Jutikkala and the ethnographer Kustaa Vilkuna, who worked for the Finnish state propaganda and information department. Nazi ideas were later added to the script by Yrjö von Grönhagen, a Finnish military attaché in Berlin.

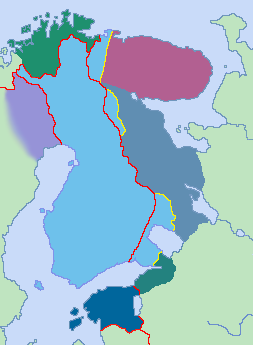
Map of the Greater Finland. Modern-day Finland and lands lost to the Soviet Union from 1940 to 1944 are in light blue. Greater Finland includes some or all of the previous Finnish territory. The picture includes the borders of Finland under the Treaty of Tartu and the 1947 Paris Peace Treaties. East Karelia Estonia and Ingria Finland Kola Torne Valley Ruija

The idea of the book was to demonstrate scientifically that East Karelia and Ingermanland are natural parts of Finland by their geography, history and culture and to legitimise their integration into Finland after a future German victory in the Second World War. The new eastern border of Finland was defined to begin from the Gulf of Finland and run via lakes Ladoga and Onega to Onega Bay in the White Sea. An unpublished adaptation of the book also featured the residential areas of Finnic Kvens in the Norwegian county of Finnmark.

The original title of Finnlands Lebensraum was Das geographische und geschichtliche Finnland ("The Geographic and Historic Finland"), but it was changed by the German publisher to fit more into Nazi ideology.

== See also ==
- Lebensraum
