= Eino Jutikkala =

Finnish historian and professor

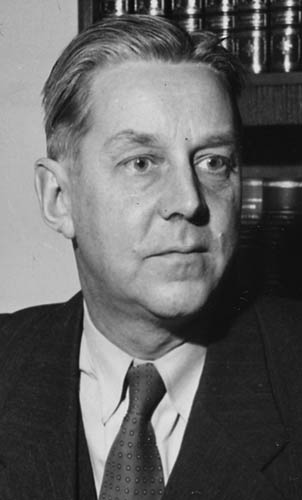
Eino Jutikkala in 1955.

Eino Kaarlo Ilmari Jutikkala (24 October 1907 – 22 December 2006), until 1931 Rinne, was a Finnish historian, and professor of history at the University of Helsinki from 1950 to 1974. He had an exceptionally long and prolific career, and is considered one of the most important Finnish historians of the 20th century.

Jutikkala was born in Sääksmäki. He wrote mainly about collective phenomena in history, focussing on social and economic history. His main contributions are in the areas of early modern period economic history and historical demography. His methodological innovations are also thought to have greatly improved the quality of local history research in Finland. He helped make Finland's history known to English-speaking readers through his book A History of Finland, written with Kauko Pirinen.

Jutikkala died in Helsinki, aged 99. In his will, he donated twenty-two million euros to the Finnish Academy of Science and Letters to be used to support research in the humanities.

== Selected works ==
- Läntisen Suomen kartanolaitos Ruotsin vallan viimeisenä aikana I–II (1932) (his doctoral dissertation)
- Finnlands Lebensraum (with Väinö Auer, 1941)
- Suomen talonpojan historia (1942) (History of the Finnish Peasant)
- Uudenajan taloushistoria (1953)
- A History of Finland (with Kauko Pirinen, 1962)
- Kuolemalla on aina syynsä (1987)

== Literature ==
- Nationalencyklopedin, 10 (1993)
- Uppslagsverket Finland, 2 (2004)
