= Chenque Hill =

Hill in Chubut, Argentina

Coordinates: 45°51′22″S 67°28′49″W

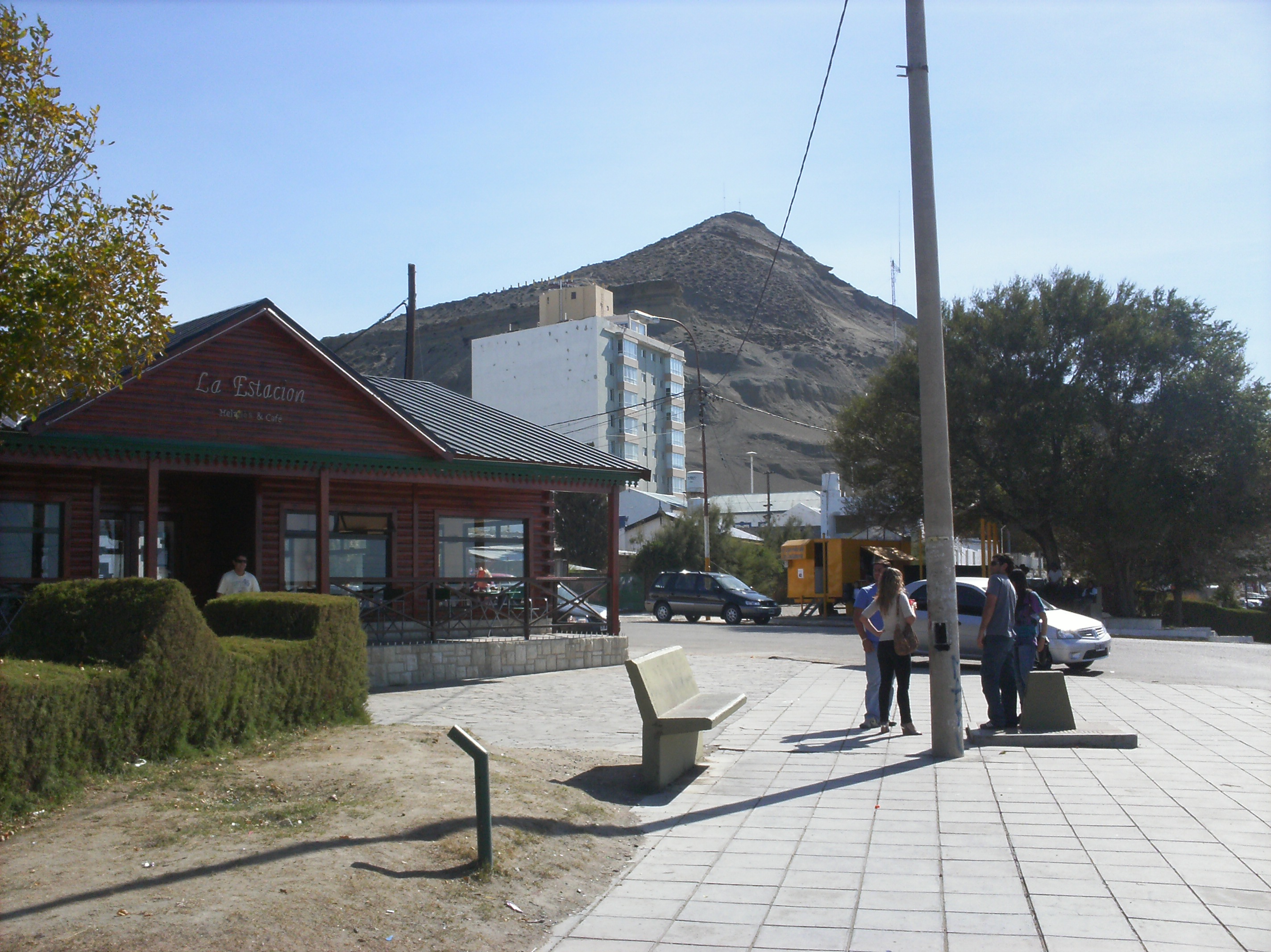
View of the most famous square

Chenque Hill (Spanish: Cerro Chenque [ˈsero ˈt͡ʃeŋke]) is a hill in Comodoro Rivadavia in southern Argentina, which divides the city in two. The business district area lies at the foot of the hill. The hill is considered a sacred symbol of Comodoro, as referenced in the city's anthem. Its highest summit reaches 212 m above sea level.

== Toponymy ==
The word chenque is frequently used in Patagonia—and to a lesser extent in the Pampas region—to refer to pre-Columbian indigenous tombs. One of the first references to the term is in the 1905 work "The Stone Age in Patagonia" by French researcher Henri de La Vaulx, who uses the term chenque to refer to human burial structures. Chenques are characterized by placing the corpse(s) on the ground then piling it up with stones. The chenque was generally located on top of hills, facing east.

In Comodoro Rivadavia, the hill was given the name "Chenque" because indigenous peoples such as the Mapuche once used it as a cemetery. Coincidentally, the first settlers who arrived at the beginning of the 20th century had their first cemetery at the foot of Chenque Hill in 1904, near the current site of National Route 3. Later, as the city developed, the cemetery became overwhelmed by the 1940s. The cemetery operated exclusively for about 40 years. However, due to a lack of space, the government of the Comodoro Rivadavia Military Zone eventually opened the Western Cemeteries in the southern zone and another one in the northern zone. In the following years, the transfer of bodies from the old cemetery began, and the final excavation was carried out in the 1980s. The move was fraught with difficulties and irregularities, mainly due to the condition of the wooden coffins and their breakage while trying to move them from one cemetery to another. Thus, the remains of tombs and skeletons can be seen resting by the shore, as a result of their incomplete transfer.

Years later, when a landslide hit the hill in the 1990s, authorities built a temporary route alongside the old one, above where the old cemetery was. Afterwards, when the original layout of National Route No. 3 was rebuilt, the temporary route fell into disuse, and many people had forgotten about the cemetery. However, in 2015, the city erected a cenotaph on that site, in remembrance to the first settlers. Moreover, the city created a circuit with games, exercise equipment and chairs for lounging—all facing the sea, in a location that once housed Comodoro's first cemetery.

== Legends ==
One legend claims that anyone who visits Chenque Hill and rubs their hands in the sandy soil will return to the region, summoned by the spirits of the ancestors who rest there. This is a popular belief that persuades people to return to the area, similar to the calafate myth, which claims that anyone who tastes barberries will never leave Patagonia, and whoever leaves will always eventually return.

Another legend claims that anyone who digs and removes skeletons or other artifacts from the hill will be punished—not just themselves but their own family members as well. According to this legend, those who keep artifacts from Chenque are to be cursed to death.
