= Comodoro Rivadavia Cathedral =

Argentinian cathedral

Coordinates: 45.86228°S 67.48519°W

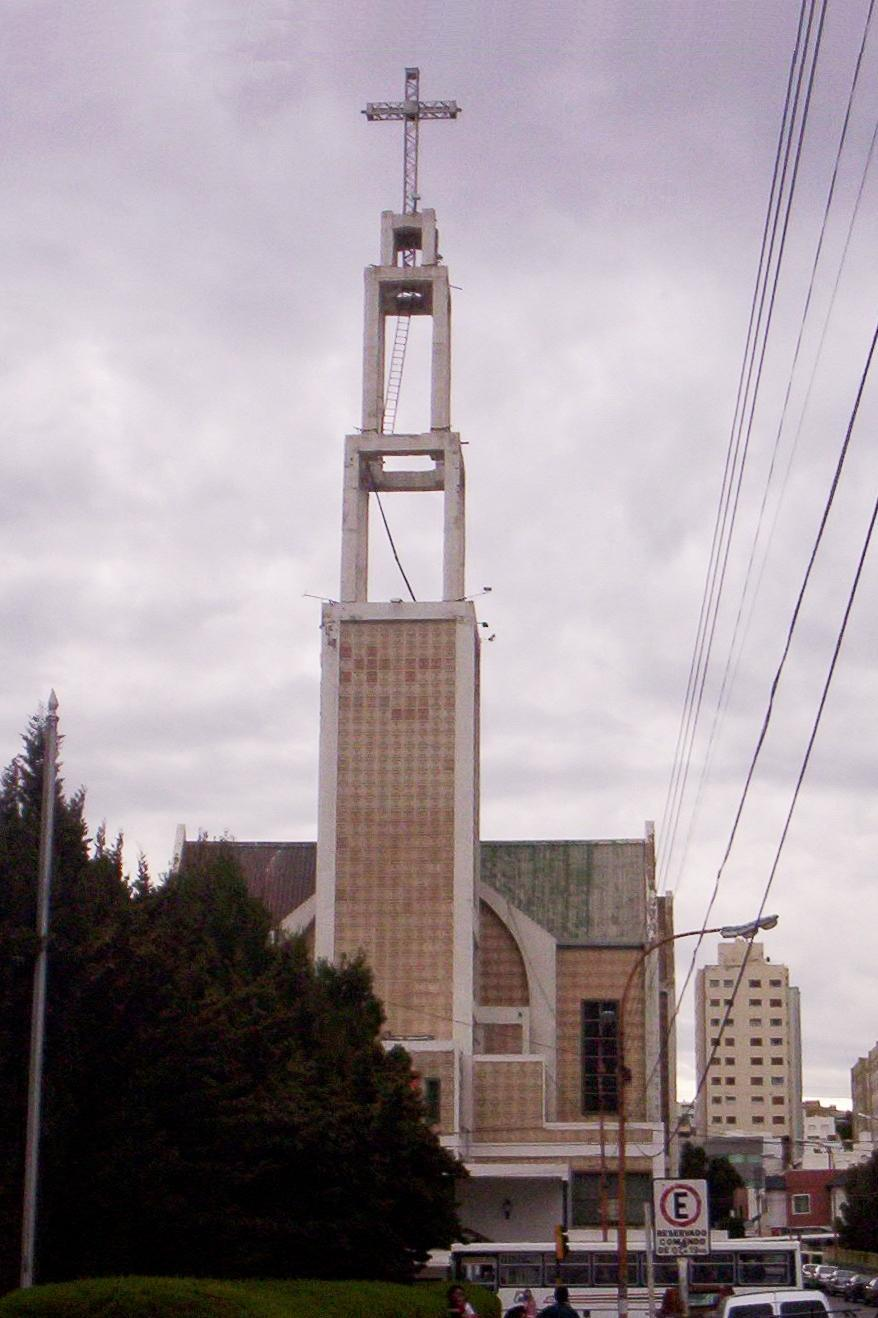
Exterior view of the Comodoro Rivadavia Cathedral.

Comodoro Rivadavia Cathedral is the cathedral church of Comodoro Rivadavia, Chubut Province, Argentina. It is situated at the intersection of Avenida Belgrano and Rivadavia. The cathedral is the city's main Roman Catholic church, serving the Diocese of Comodoro Rivadavia, part of the Archdiocese of Bahía Blanca. It was inaugurated by Bishop Moure Argimiro on November 26, 1978, and consecrated on June 9, 1979, by Monsignor Mariano Pérez, first Bishop of Comodoro Rivadavia. The building was constructed in Gothic-Modern style; some elements, such as a stained glass window, were brought from Turin, Italy, in 1959.

== History ==
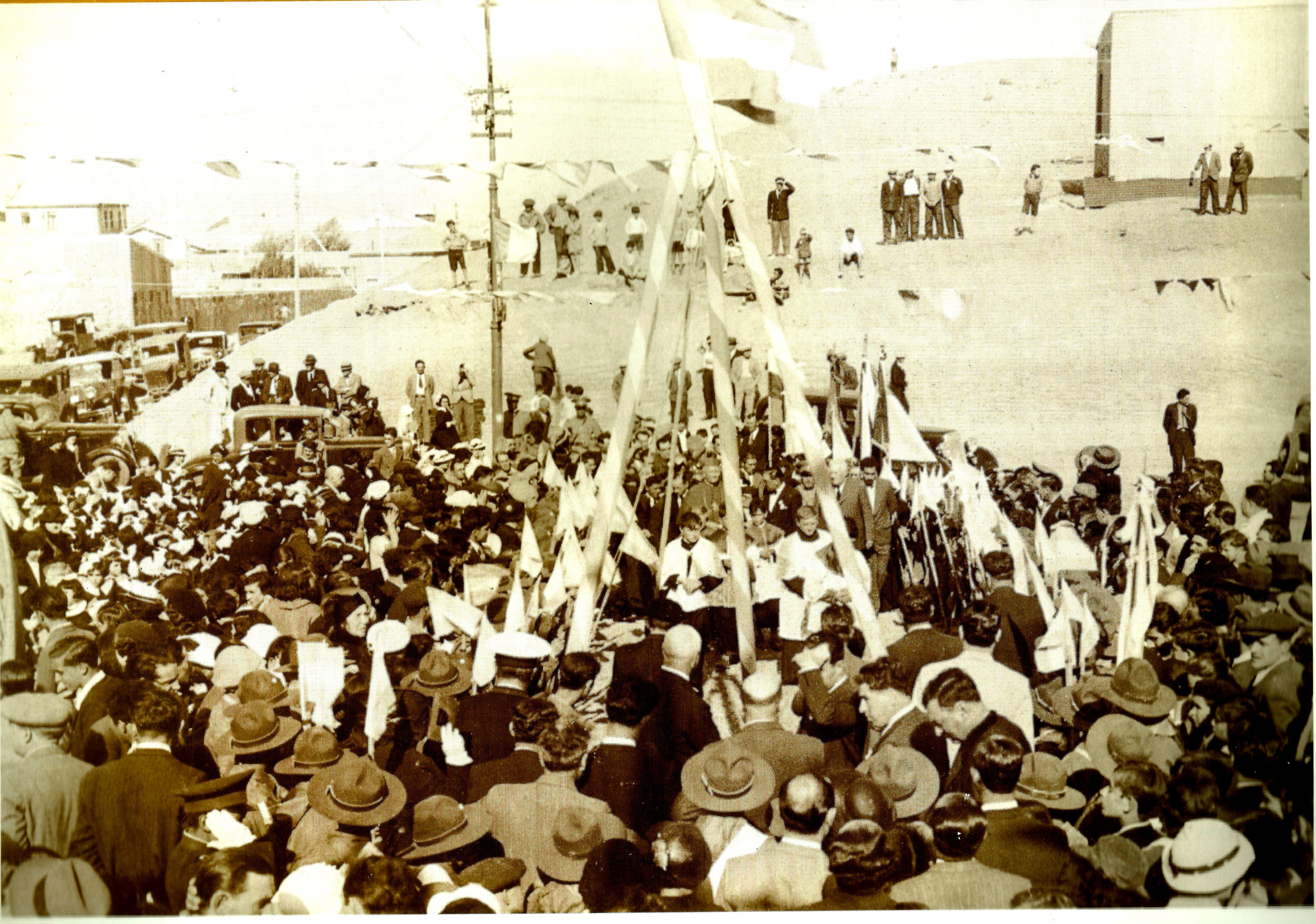
Laying the foundation stone by Diocesan Bishop Nicolas Esandi.

Until 1941, the only religious establishment in Comodoro Rivadavia was the chapel in the Colegio María Auxiliadora. On the initiative of the military governor, General Armando Raggio, plans were prepared for a larger church. This led to the construction of the San Pedro Crypt, which was first used at Christmas 1949. As a result of the growth of Comodoro Rivadavia into a large city, a bishopric was established on February 11, 1957, by Pope Pius XII, encompassing the whole of Chubut Province. The first bishop of Comodoro Rivadavia was Carlos Mariano Pérez, who took up office on July 6, 1957, remaining until December 26, 1963, when he was transferred to the Archdiocese of Salta. Work on the cathedral began in 1958, above the San Pedro Crypt, and was completed in November 1978. Dedicated to the patron saint of the diocese, John Bosco (San Juan Bosco), the cathedral was consecrated on July 9, 1979, by Bishop Argimiro Daniel Moure in the presence of President Rafael Videla. The current bishop, Joaquín Gimeno Lahoz, was appointed on July 15, 2010, and was consecrated as a Bishop on October 15, 2010.

== Architecture and fittings ==
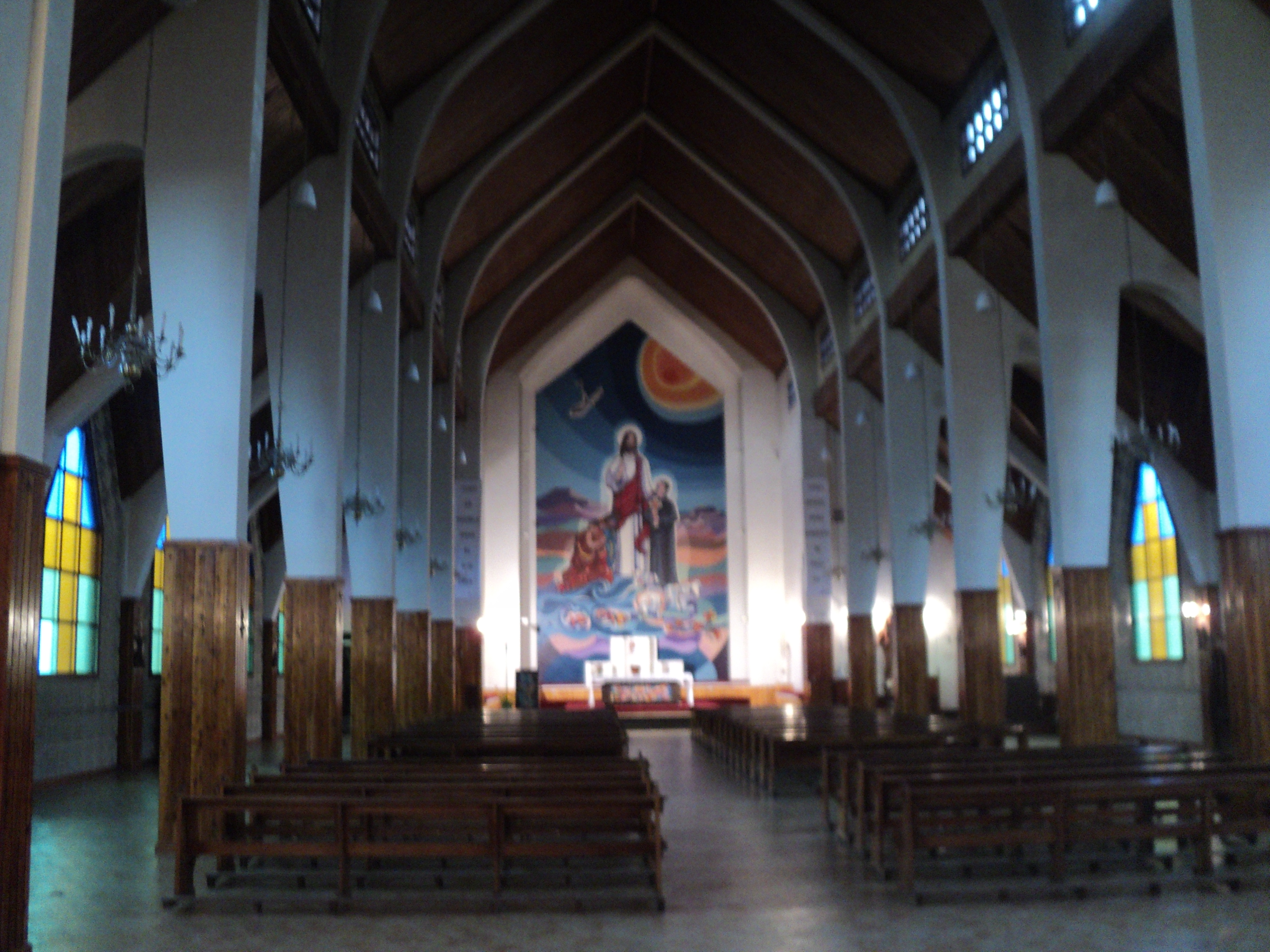
Interior.

Built above the San Pedro Crypt (underground crypt, also a bomb shelter) in the Gothic Modern style by local architect Pedro Carballo (who significantly adapted earlier plans by the engineer Guillermo Martín), the cathedral measures 62 m (203 ft) in length. It has a width of 20 m (66 ft) and is built with brick and concrete. The 12 columns inside the cathedral represent the 12 apostles. The external tower rises to a height of 46 m (151 ft), topped by an aluminum cross 11 m (36 ft) high.

The cathedral's large windows represent the openness of the community. The Dutch chandeliers and the 14 Stations of the Cross were designed by Yadwiga Szymañski de Koprowski while Dolores Ocampo de Morón painted the large central mural. The cathedral, built in a constricted space in busy Avenida Rivadavia boulevard, has no garden area surrounding it and the paths are concreted. The travel guide book publisher Lonely Planet called the building the "ugliest cathedral you'll ever see". In 2011, a new sound system was installed in the building which is reported to be the first of its kind in a Catholic church in the country.
