= Kauko Pirinen =

Finnish historian and professor

Kauko Antero Pirinen (10 January 1915, in Eno – 31 May 1999, in Helsinki), was a Finnish historian, professor in church history at Helsinki University from 1961, and professor in general church history 1963–80.

Pirinen was one of the leading 20th-century historians in Finland and one of the country's excellent church historians. His specialty was Finland's medieval history, Savonian and Karelian history, and church law.

== Bibliography ==
- Suomen vaakunat ja kaupunginsinetit. (1949, with A.W. Rancken)
- Turun tuomiokapituli keskiajan lopulla. (1956)
- Turun tuomiokapituli uskonpuhdistuksen murroksessa. (1962)
- A History of Finland. (1962, with Eino Jutikkala)
- Schaumanin kirkkolain synty. (1985)
- Suomen kirkon historia. (1 vol. 1991)
