= Väinö Auer =

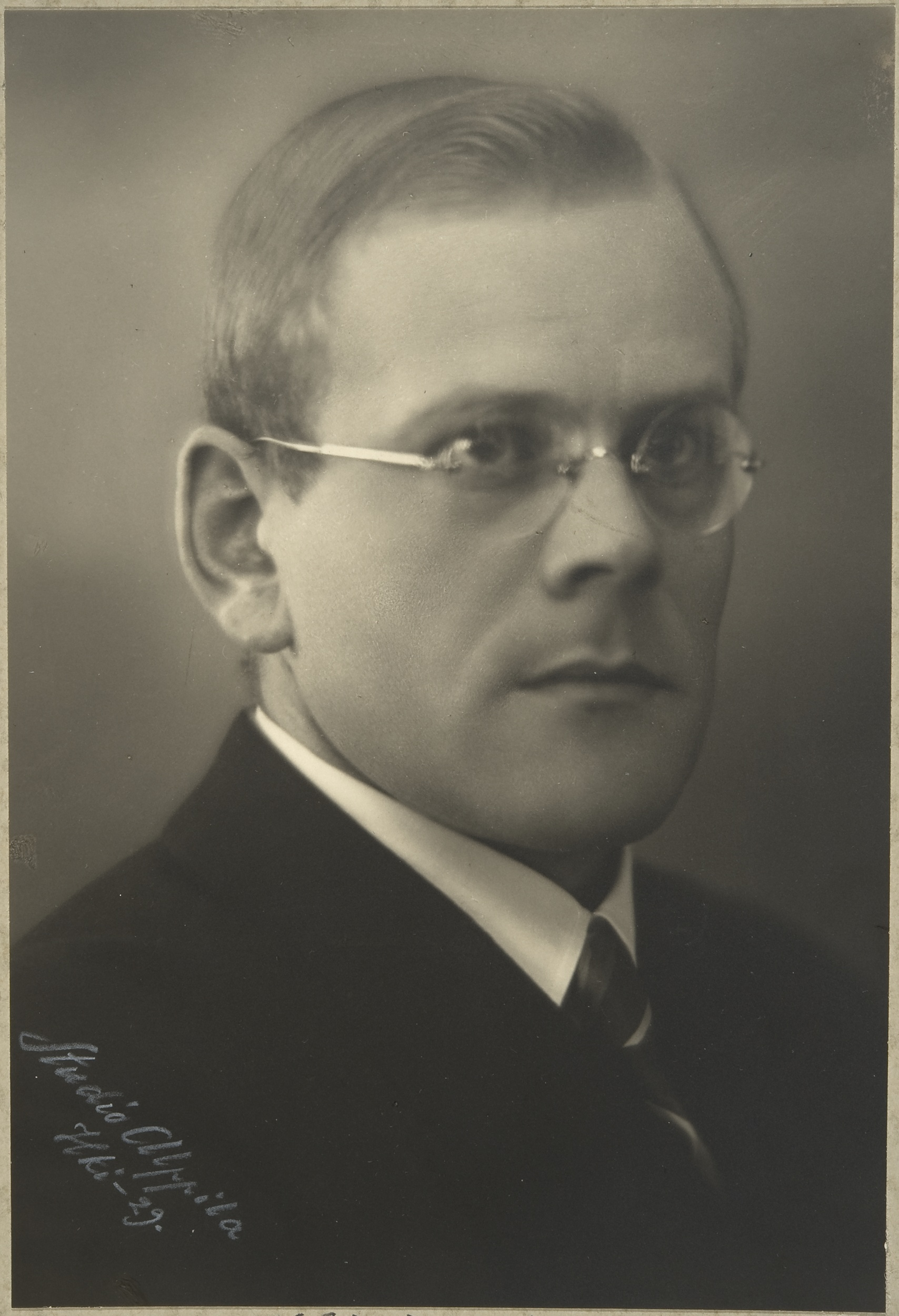
Väinö Auer in 1929.

Väinö Auer (Finnish pronunciation: [ˈʋæi̯nø ˈɑu̯er]; January 7, 1895, Helsinki – March 20, 1981, Helsinki), the son of senator Kyösti Auer, was a Finnish geologist and geographer, chiefly remembered as an explorer of Tierra del Fuego and Patagonia. He is also noted for his pioneering studies on tephrochronology, desertification, and the development of bogs.

== Biography ==
Auer studied at the University of Helsinki, graduating B.Sc. (1917), M.Sc. (1918), and Ph.D. (1923). His studies were interrupted by the Finnish Civil War, where he saw action in 1918. Auer became a professor of geography at the University of Helsinki in 1929.

While holding his professorship Auer launched expeditions to Tierra del Fuego in 1928–1929, and to Patagonia in 1937–1938. Following the end of World War II, he relocated to Argentina in 1946, entering the service of the Argentine government as an advisor to the Juan Perón government and the Central Bank, among other functions. During his years in Argentina, Auer continued his earlier studies on the natural history of Patagonia and Tierra del Fuego, while advising the Argentine government in matters related to land use and colonization of the country's southern frontier.

Auer returned to Finland in 1953. In the last years of his professional career, he served as a professor of geography (1953–1957) and geology and paleontology (1957–1963) at the University of Helsinki.

A documentary film about the life and work of Auer in Finland and Latin America was published in 2007 and broadcast on Magellan Chile. Auer was a geographer, explorer, and above all, swamp geologist. His swamp auger reached the central, post-ice age layers of Earth's climate history in Canada, Finland, Tierra del Fuego, and Patagonia. The film travels in time to the different stages of Auer's life: in the swamps and wilderness of Finland, the peculiar shallow swamps of Tierra del Fuego, and the Patagonian pampas whipped by dusty winds.

The documentary film is based on Auer's diary entries and articles. Through them, it also takes a tour of dramatic human history in the 20th century. In that perspective he confesses his involvement in the construction of a German submarine base in Tierra del Fuego in 1943.

== Notable publications ==
For a complete list cf. Alhonen & Alhonen (2006).

- Auer, V. (1960) The Quaternary History of Fuego-Patagonia. Proceedings of the Royal Society B, 152.
- Auer, V. (1956–1970) The Pleistocene of Fuego-Patagonia. Parts I–V. Annales Academiae Scientarum Fennicae A III, 45, 50, 60, 80, 100, 1300 pp.
