= Far-right politics in Finland =

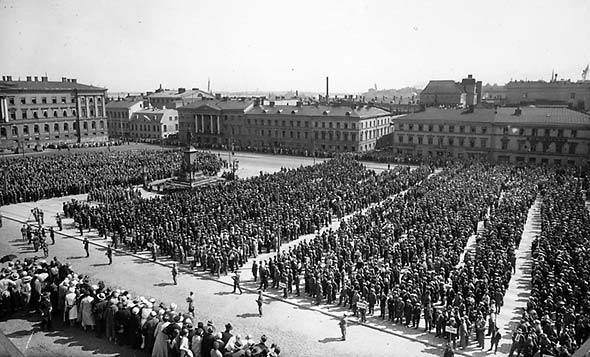
The Peasant March, a show of force in Helsinki by the Lapua Movement on 7 July 1930

In Finland, the far-right (Finnish: Äärioikeisto) was strongest in 1920–1940 when the Academic Karelia Society, Lapua Movement, Patriotic People's Movement (IKL) and Vientirauha operated in the country and had hundreds of thousands of members. In addition to these dominant far-right and fascist organizations, smaller Nazi parties operated as well.

== History ==
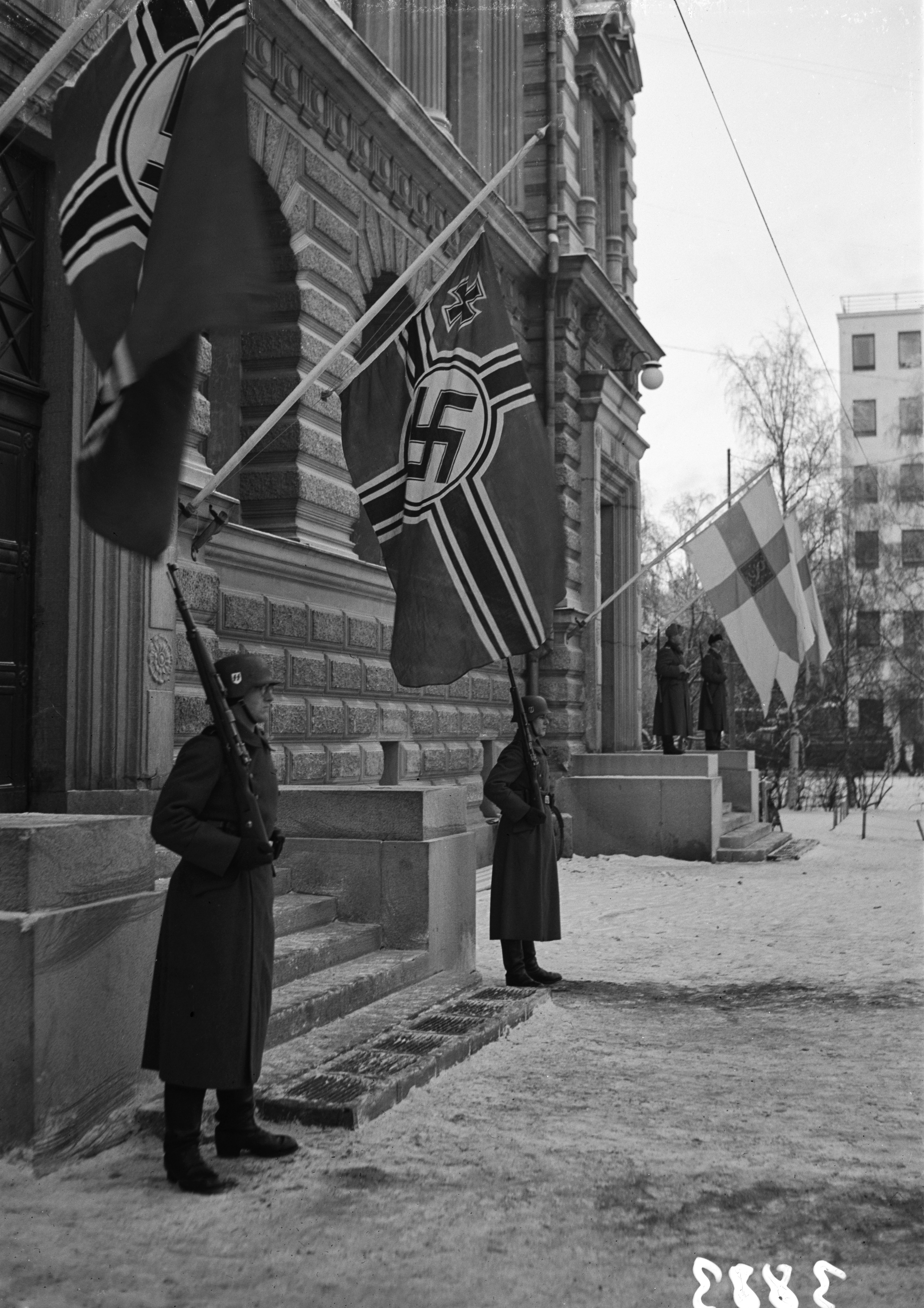
Flags of Finland and National Socialist Germany on the pole in Oulu to commemorate the 25th anniversary of Finland's independence on December 6, 1942.

Nazi parties failed to attain seats in the parliament, although former and future MPs and ministers were active in the Nazi movement. (Note: for example Foreign Minister Eljas Erkko was member of the Rising Finland and Professor Heikki Waris of the board of the National Socialist Union of Finland served as the Minister of Social Affairs in the Von Fieandt Cabinet in 1957.) The fascist IKL achieved success in the parliamentary elections of 1933, 1936 and 1939. Fascist IKL and the conservative National Coalition Party had an electoral alliance in the 1933 parliamentary election after the radical anti-communist "Lapua wing" led by Eino Suolahti and Edwin Linkomies took over party leadership. The National Coalition Party distanced itself from IKL and the far right after the alliance suffered a major election loss. The far-right groups exercised considerable political power, pressuring the government to outlaw communist parties and newspapers and expel Freemasons from the armed forces. Conservative and White Guard authorities supported the far right to a large extent, National Coalition Party and the right wing of Agrarian League supporting the Lapua movement. The government chose to appease the far-right and acquiesced to their demands following the show of power during the Peasant March and Vaasa riot. In 1922 Conservative MP and chairman of the parliamentary military committee Oskari Heikinheimo stated that "We White Guardists are not at all ashamed by the comparison [to fascists], on the contrary we confess with joy and pride we are congenial spirits with the Italian fascists."

Especially the criminal justice system was sympathetic to the far right: According to author Sirpa Kähkönen, fascists were overrepresented among prison officers and sometimes outright controlled certain correctional institutions. For example, the leadership of the Tammisaari forced labor camp belonged to the IKL and new officers were pressured to join the blackshirts. In 1932, the warden of Tammisaari labor camp Kiianlinna, his deputy Torsten Palenius and 50 officers sent greetings to Vihtori Kosola in the local IKL newspaper. The State Police had copies of the Protocols of the Elders of Zion and the International Jew in its libraries available to those wishing to read them and the chief of the State Police Ossi Holmström subscribed to the Judeo-Bolshevik conspiracy theory. The social-democratic politician Onni Happonen was arrested by police who then turned him over to a fascist lynch mob to be killed.

According to a study that was awarded by Finnish Ministry of Culture, Finland never experienced a total fascist takeover because Finland already had institutionalized anti-communism and oppressing the already paralyzed left was generally viewed as acceptable. Actors on the far-right could not challenge it from the right and articulate a credible alternative.

During the Cold War, all partied deemed fascist were banned according to the Paris Peace Treaties and all former fascist activists had to find new political homes. Despite Finlandization, many continued in public life. Yrjö Ruutu, the leader of the National Socialist Union of Finland became the head of the National Board of Education. Juhani Konkka, the party secretary and editor-in-chief of the party newspaper National Socialist, abandoned politics and became an accomplished translator, receiving a cultural award of the Soviet Union. Three former members of the Waffen SS served as ministers of defense; the Finnish SS Battalion officers Sulo Suorttanen and Pekka Malinen as well as Mikko Laaksonen, a soldier in the Finnish SS-Company, formed of pro-Nazi defectors. Chairman of the Constitutional Right Party Ilpo Järvinen was likewise SS-Company veteran. In the 1960s the president, speaker of the parliament, minister of defense and seven out of nine bishops of the Finnish Lutheran Church were former members of the Academic Karelia Society.

=== Contemporary ===
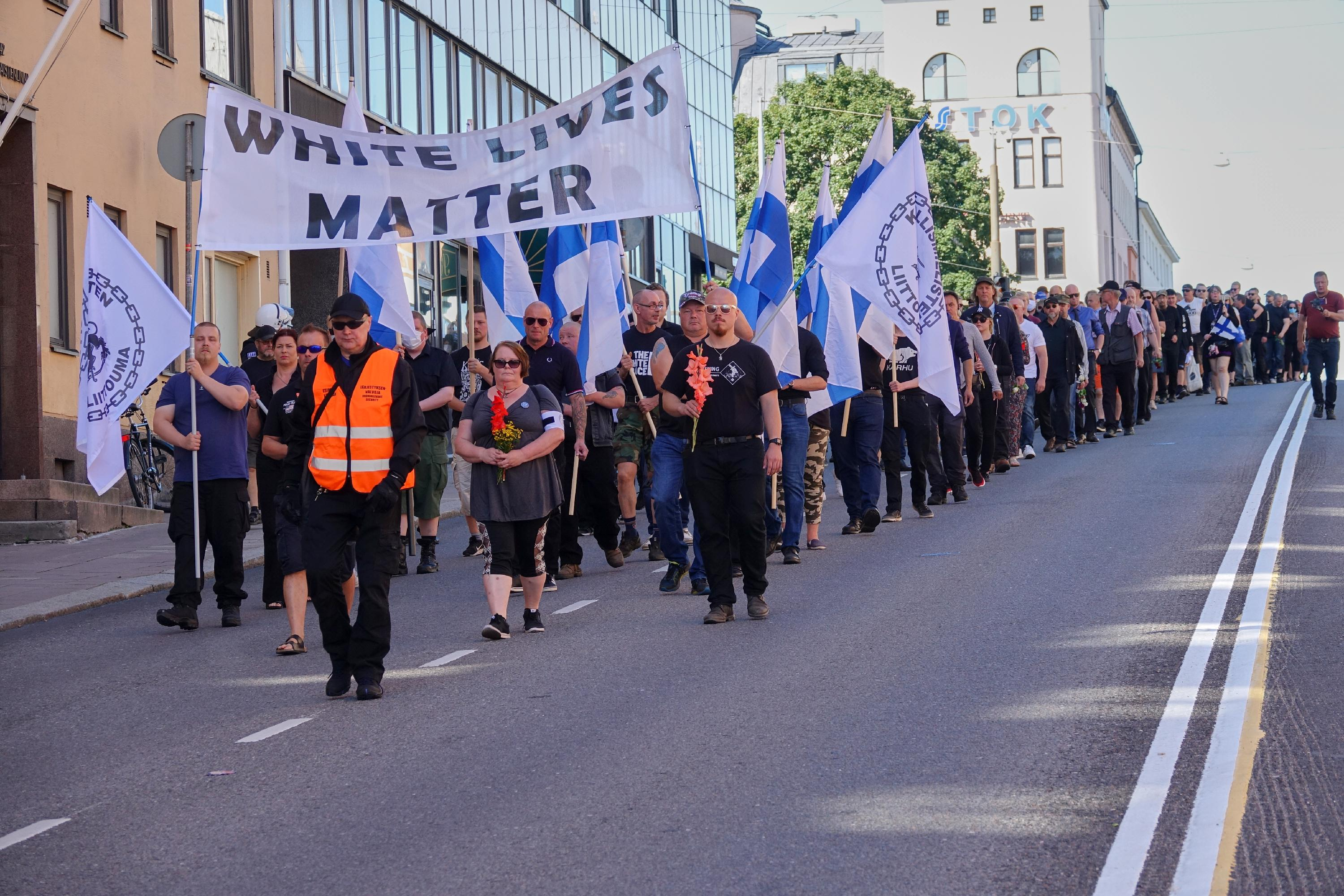
Finns Party Minister of Economic Affairs Vilhelm Junnila caused controversy for speaking at a White Lives Matter demonstration in Turku

The current second biggest Finnish party, the Finns Party, has been described as far right. The former leader of the Finns party and current speaker of the Parliament Jussi Halla-aho, has been convicted of hate speech due to his comments stating that, "Prophet Muhammad was a pedophile and Islam justifies pedophilia and Pedophilia was Allah's will." Finns Party members have frequently supported far-right and neo-Nazi movements such as the Finnish Defense League, Atomwaffen, Soldiers of Odin, Nordic Resistance Movement, Rajat Kiinni (Close the Borders), and Suomi Ensin (Finland First). Finns Party members have been criticized for supporting the White Genocide conspiracy theory. In a survey conducted by Iltalehti, one-third of the voters of the far-right Finns Party thought that "the European race must be prevented from mixing with darker races, otherwise the European native population will eventually become extinct". Finns Party Minister of the Interior Mari Rantanen wrote that if Finns remain naive on immigration, Finns "will not remain blue-eyed" and shared writings referring to refugees as "parasites". Toni Jalonen, at the time deputy-chair of the Finns Party Youth, posted a picture of a black family with the text "Vote for the Finns, so that Finland's future doesn't look like this".

In the 1990s and 2000s, before the breakthrough of the Finns Party, a few neo-Nazi candidates enjoyed success, like Janne Kujala of Finland - Fatherland (founded as Aryan Germanic Brotherhood) and Jouni Lanamäki who was previously associated with the Nordic Reich Party. Pekka Siitoin of the National Democratic Party was the fifth most popular candidate in Naantali city council elections.

According to Oula Silvennoinen, a historian known for his work on Finnish co-operation with the Germans during World War Two, the Blue-and-Black Movement-party is neo-fascist. The far-right Power Belongs to the People and Freedom Alliance were founded in 2021 and 2022 respectively. Both are openly pro-Russian and have prominent Russian propagandists as candidates such as Juha Korhonen, Janus Putkonen and Johan Bäckman. They have recruited Finns to fight in the war in Ukraine and the Russian Imperial Movement has organized military training for Finnish neo-Nazis. Rusich Group has also built a relationship with the Finnish far-right.

White nationalist "Awakening" conference is held annually in Finland, attracting some hundreds of white nationalists from around the globe. The event has been attended by white supremacists from around the world; Jared Taylor of American Renaissance, Kevin MacDonald, representatives of the National Corps and others.

== Nazism in Finland ==
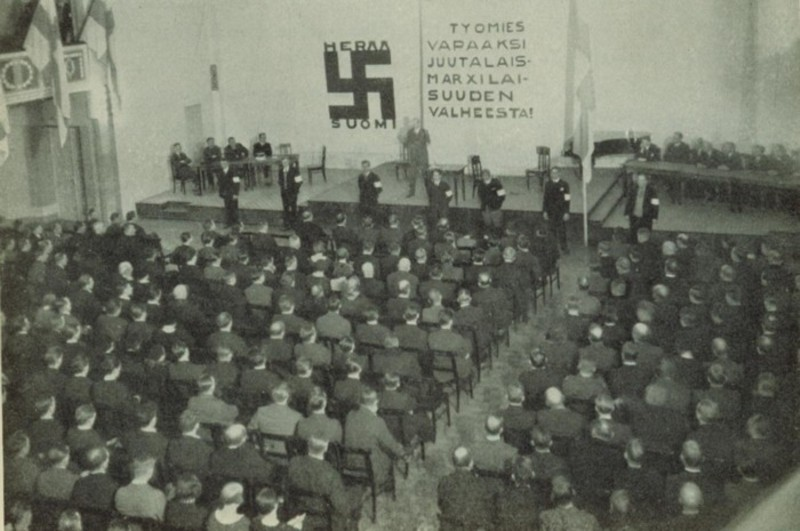
Captain Arvi Kalsta addressing an SKJ meeting

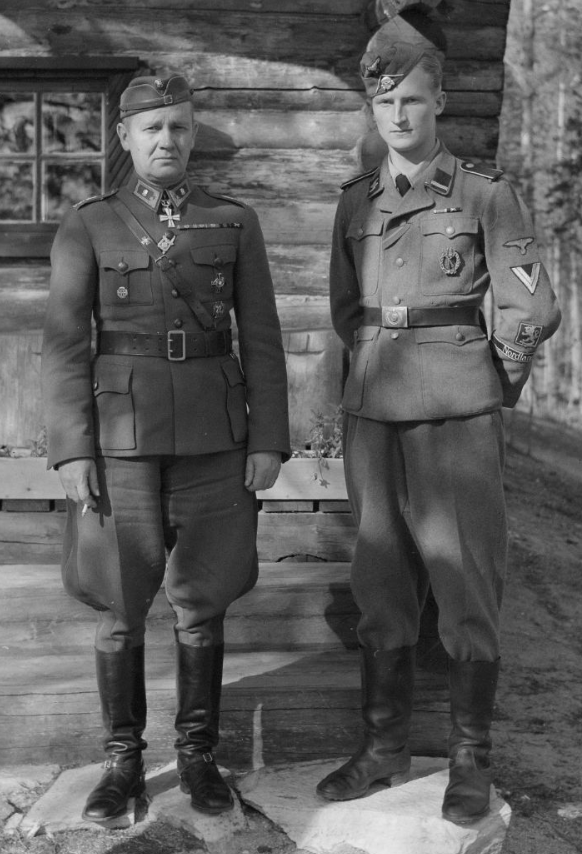
Jäger Major General Erkki Raappana with his son SS-Rottenführer Ermo Raappana. The SS was seen as carrying on the legacy of the Jäger Movement

Several Nazi parties operated in Finland in the 1930s and 1940s, among them the Finnish People's Organisation (SKJ) led by Jäger Captain Arvi Kalsta with 20,000 members and the Blue Cross with 12,000 members. Even the Swedish-speaking Finns had their own Nazi organizations such as the People's Community Society led by the former governor Admiral Hjalmar von Bonsdorff and Gunnar Lindqvist and the Black Guard led by Örnulf Tigerstedt.

One of Finland's largest publishing companies, Werner Söderström Osakeyhtiö, was granted publishing rights to Mein Kampf after the Winter War in 1940 and Lauri Hirvensalo was approved as a translator by a German publishing house after WSOY confirmed his "Aryan" ancestry. In 1941–1944, two editions of Mein Kampf, 27,000 and 32,000 copies respectively were sold, a large number in Finland, and professor Veikko Antero Koskenniemi wrote a glowing review of the book for Uusi Suomi newspaper. During the first week after its publication, 8,000 copies were sold. Koskenniemi was also the vice-president of the Association of European Writers (Europäische Schriftsteller-Vereinigung, ESV), organised by Goebbels. The group had about 40 prominent Finnish authors, including Mika Waltari, Tito Colliander, Jarl Hemmer and Maila Talvio. Among other prominent politicians, Prime Ministers Edwin Linkomies and Antti Hackzell had been members of the Finnish-German Society that promoted Nazism.

The Nazi groups existed as a cooperating network and there was some overlap among the groups, Colliander for example also belonged to Tigerstedt's Black Guard, and Tigerstedt himself also belonged to a Nazi party known as the Patriotic People's Party (Isänmaallinen Kansanpuolue). Despite this, some of the groups competed with one another, for instance the SKSL and the SKJ disagreed about the language question. While the SKSL insisted on Finnish language nationalism, the SKJ was bilingual, had many prominent Swedish-speaking Finnish Nazis such as von Bonsdorff and Himmler's personal friend Thorvald Oljemark and was popular among the Swedish-speaking population of Uusimaa.

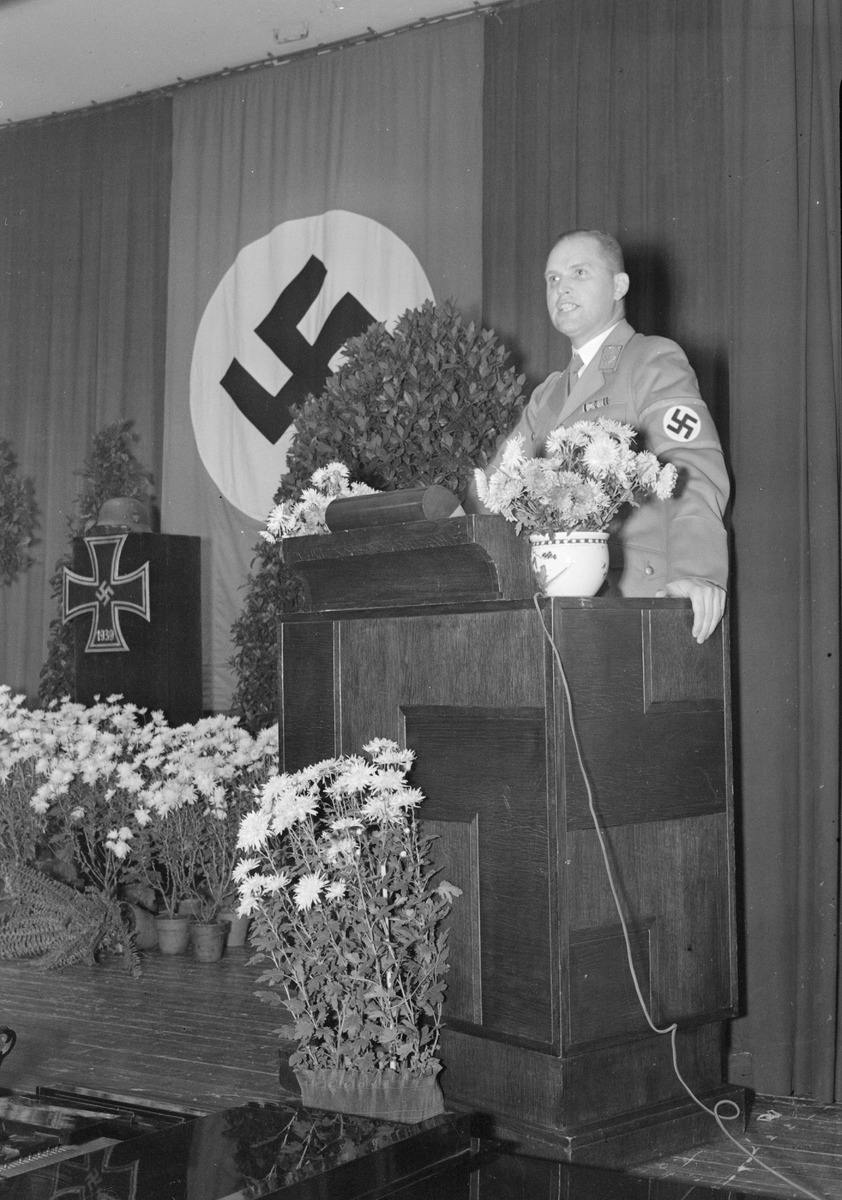
Nazi Party officer holding a speech in Helsinki at the behest of the Finnish-German Society

Even outside of the actual National Socialist movements, there was glorification of the Nazi Germany in Finnish society. The Finnish police magazine wrote about German police sports and the "Citizens' Reporting Service" (Volksmeldedienst) set up by Reinhard Heydrich uncritically and emphasizing the effectiveness of the Gestapo. The Finnish secret police operated under Ministry of the Interior, led by pro-Nazi and antisemitic Toivo Horelli. The State Police itself was led by also openly pro-Nazi and antisemitic Arno Anthoni and under him it cooperated with the SS, Einsatzkommando Finnland and Sicherheitsdienst. The State Information Service, responsible for propaganda and censorship, also employed the aforementioned right-wing extremists and published pro-German material like Finnlands Lebensraum.

It has been alleged that yet another Nazi group, the Finnish Realm Union (Suomen Valtakunnan Liitto, SVL) was prepared by the Nazi Germany to perform a National Socialist coup against the Finnish government in the case Finland seeks a separate peace with the Soviet Union. According to authors Juha Pohjonen and Oula Silvennoinen the famous Finnish war hero Captain Lauri Törni was also part of this operation. The SVL was led by Mauno Vannas, professor of Ophthalmology and Rolf Nevanlinna, mathematics professor and developer of Nevanlinna theory and its program had been personally approved by Himmler and Alfred Rosenberg. The SVL functioned as an umbrella organization of the pro-German and National Socialist groups. The Finnish Realm Union included strikingly many representatives of art, culture and science; the most well-known were the sculptor Wäinö Aaltonen, the geologist Väinö Auer, the composer Yrjö Kilpinen, the linguist J. J. Mikkola and the film director Risto Orko. In addition to the coup plans, the Germans created a Pro-German resistance movement in Finland, recruiting Finnish SS-men and extreme right-wingers. The resistance movement operated for several years after the war.

The Waffen-SS was seen as carrying on the legacy of the Jäger Movement, Finnish volunteers in the German Army during the First World War. Even before the Second World War, the Nazis somewhat reciprocated the Finnish nationalist Teutonophilia, for example a unit of the Sturmabteilung was named after the 27th Jäger Battalion and maintained ties with Finnish veterans' organizations.

=== Some pre-1945 Nazi groups ===
- Black Guard
- Blue Cross (1942–1944)
- Finnish Realm Union (1940s)
- Finnish-Socialist Workers' Party (1934–1944)
- Finnish National Socialist Labor Organisation (1940–1944)
- Finnish People's Organisation (1933–1936)
- Finnish Labor Front (1930s)
- Labor Organisation of Brothers-in-Arms
- National Socialists of Finland (1941–1944)
- Organisation of National Socialists (1940–1944)
- National Socialist Union of Finland (1930s)
- Party of Finnish Labor (1932–1945)
- Patriotic People's Party (1930s)
- People's Community Society (1940–1944)
- Rising Finland (1940s)

=== Contemporary ===
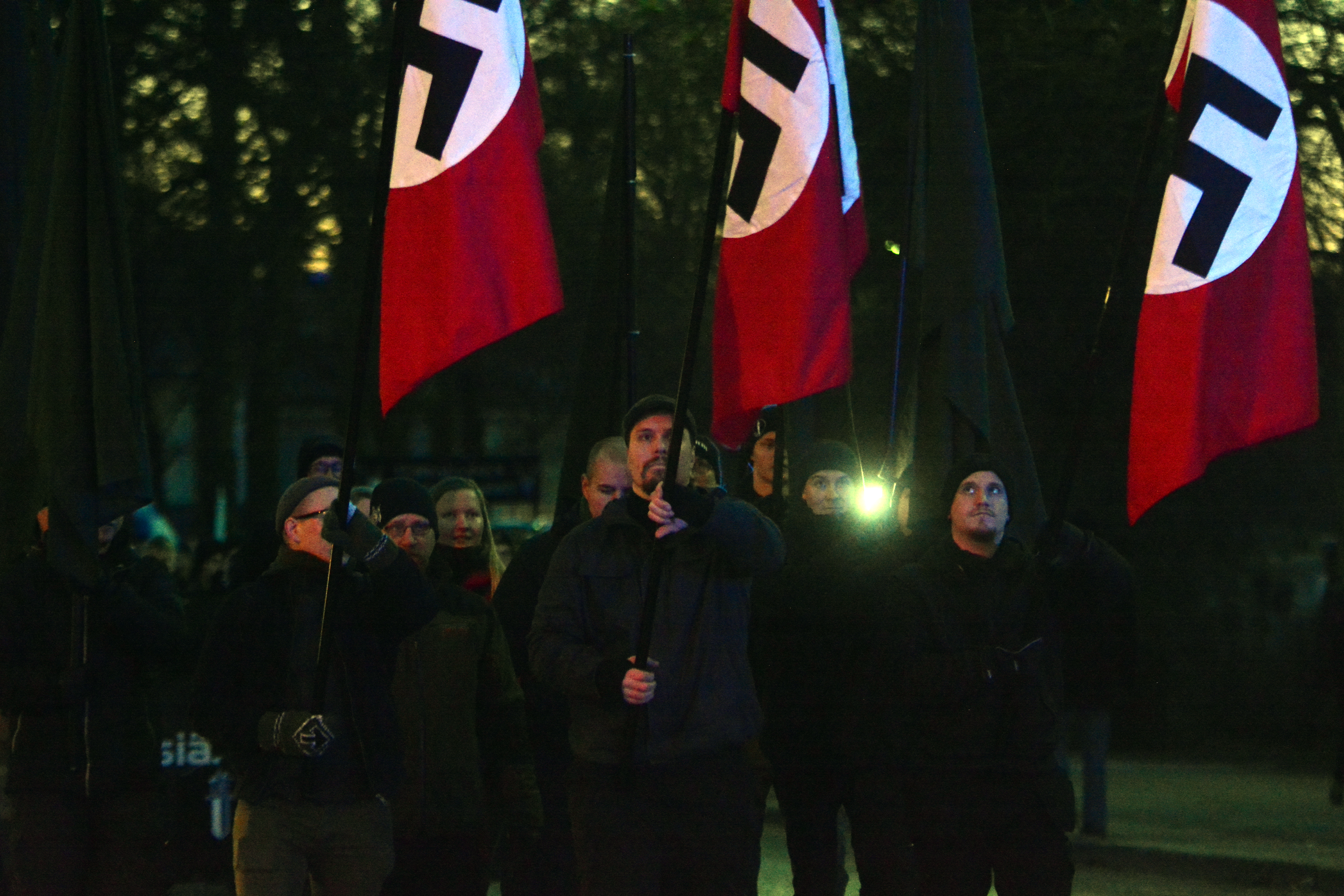
NRM Finnish independence day demonstration, 2018.

Suomen Vastarintaliike ("the Finnish Resistance Movement") is the Finnish branch of the Nordic Resistance Movement. The members also participate in hand-to-hand combat and shooting training arranged by the organization. The group also advocates pan-Finno-Ugrism, or "Kindred-folk ideology" ("Heimoaate"), and unification with ethnically Finnic Estonia is part of the group's program. The organisation is responsible for multiple violent crimes, including attacking anti-racism and gay pride demonstrations and stabbing participants of a left-wing event. According to an investigation by Yleisradio, two thirds of the members have a conviction for a violent crime. The FRM is responsible for 2016 Helsinki Asema-aukio assault. The group also awarded the title of "activist of the year" to a member convicted of torturing a man to death and possessing illegal weapons. The group assaults people they consider political enemies in their homes, a practice they dub "home visits". In 2020 a local Finns Party campaign chairman was left critically injured after being beaten with a clawhammer in his home in Jämsä. A man connected to the group is charged with attempted murder along with another man. The FRM also vandalized the Israeli embassy over 20 times and defaced synagogues, causing the Finnish ambassador to be called to the Israeli foreign ministry in Jerusalem twice. On 8 January 2021 Finnish police arrested yet another FRM member for murder, this time in Riihimäki. On 17 March 2021 Finnish police arrested an FRM member and confiscated several crates of explosives from his apartment.

The FRM and other far-right nationalist parties organize an annual torch march demonstration in Helsinki in memory of the Finnish SS-battalion on the Finnish independence day which ends at the Hietaniemi cemetery where members visit the tomb of Carl Gustaf Emil Mannerheim and the monument to the Finnish SS Battalion. The event is protested by antifascists, leading to counter-demonstrators being violently assaulted by FRM members who act as security. The demonstration attracted close to 3,000 participants according to the estimates of the police and hundreds of officers patrolled Helsinki to prevent violent clashes. The march is attended and promoted by the Finns Party while it is condemned by left-wing parties. Iiris Suomela of the Green League characterized it as "obviously neo-Nazi" and expressed her disappointment in it being attended by such a large number of people.

In addition to violent crimes, the FRM is closely connected to the proscribed terrorist organization National Action. A Finnish corporal who had served in Afghanistan and was a member of both the FRM and National Action was convicted of terror offenses and membership in the proscribed organization while living in Llansilin. The leader of National Action, Benjamin Raymond, also visited the FRM in Finland and held speeches and was pictured posing with an assault rifle. The FRM also cooperates with the neo-Nazi military formation Azov Battalion according to Yle. Dozens of the Finns are also part of the Iron March terror network famous for spawning the Atomwaffen Division.

Even though the FRM rejects parliamentarism unlike the Swedish branch, there have been numerous cases where members of the Finns Party have attracted criticism from the other parties and antifascists for attending events organized by or with the FRM. Several members of the Finns Party took part in an event where the participants shot and threw knives at targets, using photos of members of the Rinne Cabinet and attended an event commemorating Eugen Schauman who assassinated Nikolay Bobrikov. Finns Party Youth members and leaders also attend "Etnofutur" ethnonationalist conferences in Estonia organized by the Blue Awakening together with the FRM. The founder of Blue Awakening and current MP for EKRE Ruuben Kaalep has been described as a neo-Nazi and connected to the local proscribed terror group and Atomwaffen affiliate Feuerkrieg Division.

On 30 November 2017, the Pirkanmaa District Court banned the Nordic Resistance Movement in Finland for 'flagrantly violated the principles of good practice'. The ban was appealed and a request by the police for a temporary ban was turned down. In September 2018, the Court of appeal in Turku upheld the ban. In March 2019, the Supreme Court placed a temporary ban on the group. On 22 September 2020 the Supreme Court upheld the ban. The Supreme Court noted in its ruling that "The use of violence linked to the organization's activities has to be considered a part of the organization's operations... The operating methods that were considered unlawful represented a substantial part of the organization's operations, and [the organization] only engaged in a limited amount of other types of activities".

The National Bureau of Investigation suspects the Nordic Resistance Movement to be continuing its operations under the names Kohti Vapautta!, Atomwaffen Division Finland and Suomalaisapu. In its annual threat assessment for 2020, the bureau found that despite the ban, the threat of far-right terrorism had risen. According to the University of Oslo Center for Research on Extremism:

some NRM activists have reasoned that only radical measures will be effective post-ban, thus coming to support e.g. the accelerationist model of activity. Certain members of the group have also appeared as contributors to publications that promote esoteric forms of neo-Nazism. A corresponding shift towards a more "cultic" direction has also been observed in the United Kingdom after the banning of the National Action (NA).

== Far-right and antisemitic media ==
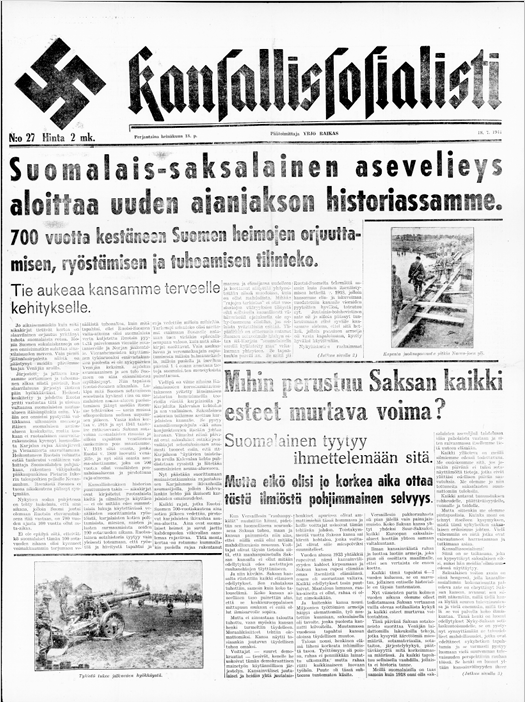
Front page of Kansallissosialisti, the National Socialist.

"These human species who have sunk lower than animals have to be removed from among those who have the right to propagate their bloodline, and their removal has to be done mercilessly."

— Martti Pihkala

In 1918 during the Civil War, the White Guard leader and leading ideologue Martti Pihkala published a book "What kind of Finland we must create?" which argued for an extensive eugenics program and forced sterilization and extermination of communists, promiscuous women and "racial undesirables". It has been argued the book inspired mass killings perpetrated by the victorious Whites. In 1919 the White Guard associated propaganda organ Church-National Enlightenment Bureau published "What is Bolshevism" targeted at former Red Guards. The book argued that communism was a Jewish plot and communist leaders were almost exclusively Jewish and Jews were a race "that has a peculiar ability to live without working at the expense of others by swindling". "The Protocols of the Elders of Zion" appeared in Finnish first in 1920, translated from the original Russian language. Vicar of the Evangelical Lutheran Church of Finland and member of the Diet J. W. Wartiainen wrote in 1922 the antisemitic book called "World-historical importance of the Jews as former Godly nation and current mob of Satan".

From the 1920s to 1940s, Finland had numerous far-right and antisemitic newspapers and magazines. According to a study done by Jari Hanski of 433 magazines, journals and newspapers from the period, 16.4% contained antisemitism. Several of the anti-Semitic magazines had a national socialist or other extreme right party or group behind them. The publishing company Vasara (their magazines were Tapparamies and Siniristi), Finnish People's Organisation (Herää Suomi, Hakaristi and Hakkorset), the Finnish Labor Front society (Työrintama and Kansallinen työ), the Blue Cross-society (Kustaa Vaasa and Uusi Eurooppa) and the independent magazines För Frihet och Rätt, Fascisti, Kansallinen Sana and Vapaa Suomi "were all very active in their effort to prove that Jews sought world domination". The largest Finnish extreme right party, the IKL published 30 magazines and newspapers (Ajan Suunta, Aktivisti, Lapuan päiväkäsky, IKL, Sinimusta and Luo Lippujen among others) which published antisemitic articles as well". In the 1930s, the Patriotic Citizens of Viitasaari published numerous anti-semitic and anti-freemasonry booklets in prints of tens of thousands.

In addition to native Finnish fascist and Nazi organisations, German and Russian Nazi organizations also published material. The Russian National Fascist Organization operated in the country, and white emigre fascist newspapers like Nash Put and Fashist were published by white general and emigre leader Severin Dobrovolski. The Nordische Gesellschaft led by Alfred Rosenberg also published pro-Nazi magazines in Finland. Like other far-right propagandists, Dobrovolski and the Helsinki liaison of Nordische Gesellschaft Anitra Karsten also worked for the State Information Service.

In addition to far-right printed media, movies with nationalist-antisemitic themes were also published. In the most popular film of 1938, Jääkärin morsian (Jäger's Bride) for instance the main antagonist is a Jewish spy whom the hero assaults while shouting antisemitic abuse. The writer and director of the film, Risto Orko, would later become the CEO of the biggest Finnish film company Suomi-Filmi and join the Nazi Finnish Realm Union.

After the war, Untersturmführer Unto Parvilahti's memoirs made the case the USSR was led by Jews, and Parvilahti's book became a great success, going through 11 editions and being translated into multiple languages. Parvilahti also became a sought-after speaker in veterans' events and conservative parties speaking tours.

=== Holocaust Denial in Finland ===
Holocaust denial started in Finland almost immediately after the war, with many Finns who had been involved in the far-right and Nazi movements publishing articles questioning the Holocaust. Prominent early Finnish Holocaust deniers include professor C. A. J. Gadolin, CEO Carl-Gustaf Herlitz, architech Carl O. Nordling and ambassador Teo Snellman. In early 1970s, a Finnish translation of a pamphlet denying the Holocaust written by Vera Oredsson was distributed in Finland. Pekka Siitoin's Patriotic Popular Front started distributing a Finnish translation of Richard Harwood's Did Six Million Really Die? in 1976.

In the late 1980 and early 1990s, the newspaper Uusi Suunta published by the National Radical Party wrote how the supposed Jewish owned media maligned fascism with Holocaust "sob stories" that "have never been proven" to undermine the nationalist movement. One issue of Uusi Suunta stated that "The horrors of the concentration camps, that are not true by half, have been tied to the nationalist movement regardless of nationality." In the 1990s the party secretary of the National Democratic Party Olavi Koskela said that "the unbelievable Holocaust lies" enable the Jewish rulership over multicultural, multiracial and multilingual society. Finland - Fatherland's newspaper Kansallinen Rintama made similar arguments.

Antisemitism has experienced a resurgence after the Cold War, both in the internet and real life. Medical Licentiate Vesa-Ilkka Laurio wrote a blog frequently denying the Holocaust and criticizing democracy from a Christian fundamentalist perspective. Swedenborgian Nova Hierosolyma society's Uusi Jerusalem website also publishes Holocaust denial material, an article written by Erkki Kivilohkare claiming only 100,000 Jews died in the Holocaust. Another Swedenborgian fundamentalist Markku Juutinen has also denied holocaust in the Kumouksen ääni magazine.

In 2013, the newspaper Magneettimedia and its editor-in-chief, department store tycoon Juha Kärkkäinen, were convicted of agitation against a population group in connection with antisemitic content published in the newspaper. Originally launched as a customer and advertising paper, Magneettimedia was distributed to hundreds of thousands of households through the mail and the Kärkkäinen department store chain. It combined alternative health content and conspiracy theories with increasingly explicit antisemitic material. The newspaper published articles denying the Holocaust and articles such as "Zionist terrorism" and "CNN, Goldman Sachs and Zionist Control" translated from David Duke. Following the conviction, Juha Kärkkäinen withdrew from the publication, and the newspaper continued as an online publication under the control of the association Pohjoinen Perinne, whose leadership has been linked to the neo-Nazi Nordic Resistance Movement. Members of the movement have also distributed Holocaust-denial material in schools. Other alternative media sites, including MV-media and Verkkomedia, are known for publishing articles denying the Holocaust.

Far-right Finns Party General Secretary Olli Immonen has also multiple times shared a blog criticizing the "Holocaust-religion". The Finns Party leader Jussi Halla-aho also referred to Holocaust as "holohoax". Pseudonymous Thomas Dalton who is a prolific author of Holocaust denial books and has republished On the Jews and Their Lies and The Protocols of the Elders of Zion is suspected of being a researcher in University of Helsinki according to Demokraatti.

== Terrorism ==
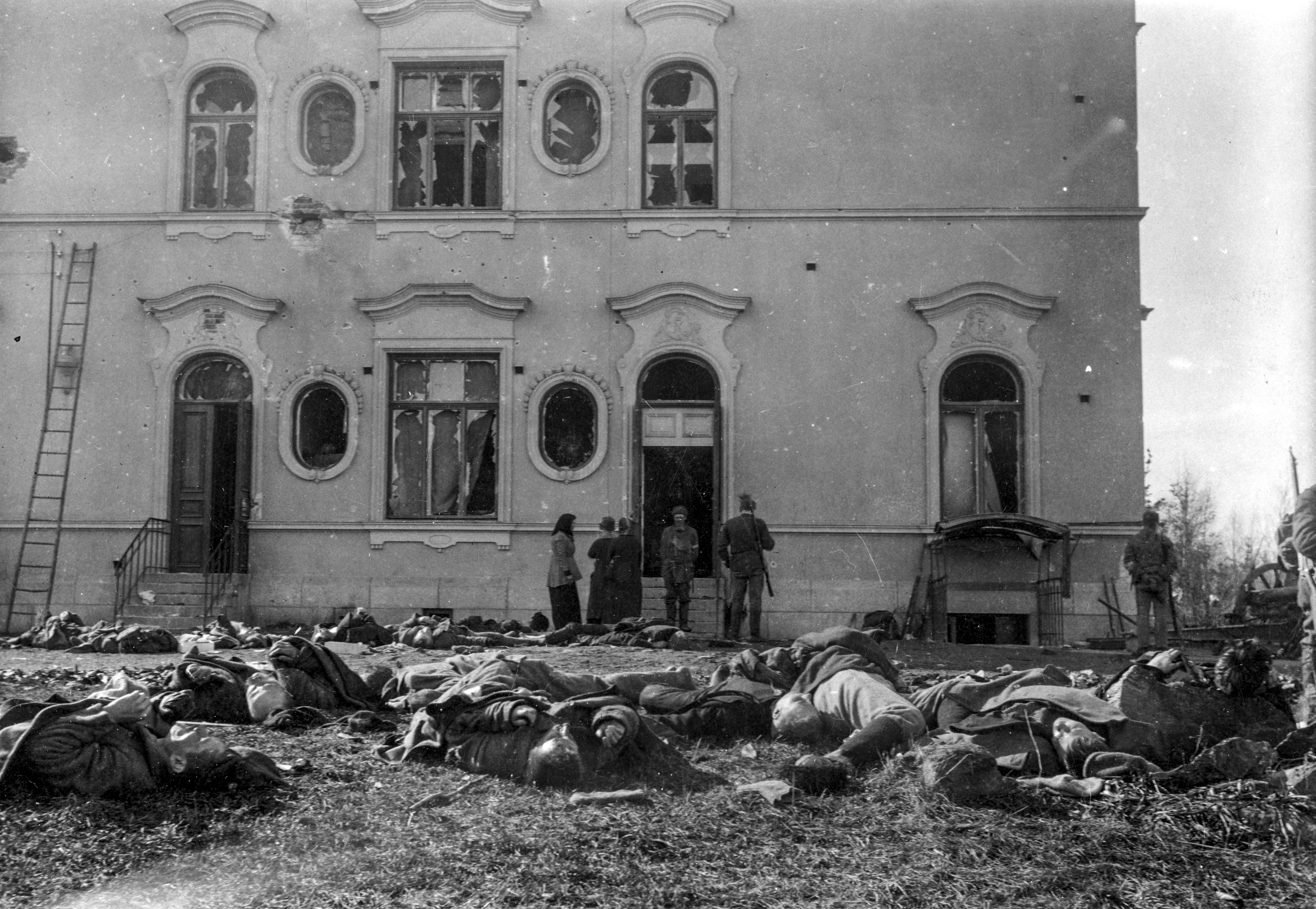
Murdered leftists in Tampere.

Arguably the first modern act of right-wing terrorism is the assassination of General-Governor Nikolay Bobrikov by Finnish nationalist Eugen Schauman in 1904. However, this characterization is controversial in Finnish society where Schauman is widely idolized; Prime Minister Matti Vanhanen had to defend himself against backlash after describing the act as such.

Schauman's act inspired the nationalist movement and was quickly followed by the assassination of Eliel Soisalon-Soininen, the Chancellor of Justice by Lennart Hohenthal. Soisalon-Soininen was the highest-ranking servant of the Tsar in Finland after the governor-general, and therefore an "arch-traitor" in the eyes of the nationalists. In 1904-1905 a secret Finnish nationalist society Verikoirat (the Bloodhounds) assassinated Russians, police officers and informants and bombed police stations. The group also planned to assassinate the Tsar while he was vacationing in Primorsk but missed him. In 1905-1907 another secret society Karjalan Kansan Mahti (Might of the Karelians) were responsible for multiple murders of Russians and weapon thefts and bank robberies.

10,000 leftists were executed by the victorious White Guard forces during the White Terror of the Finnish Civil War in 1918. White Guard associated newspapers spread the myth of Judeo-Bolshevism and a rumor spread among the White Guard that the Jews of Vyborg had aided the Red Guard, and a group of Jägers planned to round up and execute all the Jews living in the city. The plan was never executed in its planned extent, though a number of Jews were executed in the Vyborg massacre.

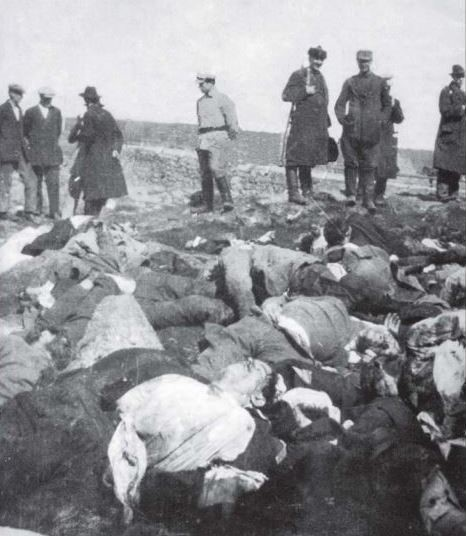
Hundreds of people belonging to ethnic minorities were executed in Vyborg for their supposed Bolshevik leanings.

In 1919, a group called Aktivistien Keskus (Base of the Activists) planned a large-scale sabotage in St. Petersburg. 35 Ingrian Finns were armed with handguns and explosives. The plan was to blow up the water works, the power plant and certain factories and set up fires all around the city that could not be put out. The operation was partially successful; the waterworks were destroyed and targets around the city were bombed and set on fire, but the bombing of the power plant failed, and one man was captured. Dozens of people were killed and wounded.

In 1927, a group consisting of Finnish guides and White Russian emigres crossed into the USSR from Finland and bombed Soviet government offices with dozens of casualties. The Russians belonged to a group called the "White Idea" that aligned with the Russian Fascist Party.

In 1920s-1940s, far-right and fascist groups attacked left-wing events and politicians systematically, resulting in deaths. The groups were responsible for burning down and bombing gathering places of the leftists. Minister of the Interior Heikki Ritavuori was assassinated for supposedly being too lenient towards communists.

In 1945 after the armistice with the Soviet Union, nationalist youth groups bombed multiple left-wing targets in Helsinki. Attacks in Haaga and Vallila against left-wing meeting halls and papers followed, with youths planting improvised ethanol bottle explosives. A group identifying themselves as "fascists from Munkkiniemi" used dynamite and IEDs built from anti-aircraft shells to cause an explosion at the offices of the Vapaa Sana newspaper.

During the Cold War, far-right activism was limited to small illegal groups like the clandestine Nazi occultist group led by Pekka Siitoin who made headlines after arson of the printing houses of the Communist Party of Finland. His associates also sent a letter bomb to the headquarters of the Finnish Democratic Youth League. Another group called the "New Patriotic People's Movement" bombed the left-wing Kansan Uutiset newspaper and the embassy of communist Bulgaria, although there were no casualties and the bomb at the embassy caused minor damage.

In 1975, in Petäjävesi an election campaign event of the communist SKDL was bombed by self-declared neo-fascists. There were no deaths although the bomb caused material damages.

In November 1978, the office of the Southern Saimaa Union of Socialist Youth was destroyed in an arson attack. The perpetrators left behind a swastika painted on the wall.

In the 1986 Oulu airplane hijacking, Neo-Nazis hijacked an airliner in Oulu Airport, demanding 60,000 marks for a Neo-Nazi party they were affiliated with.

The skinhead culture gained momentum during the late 1980s and peaked during the late 1990s. In 1991, Finland received a number of Somali immigrants who became the main target of Finnish skinhead violence in the following years, including four attacks using explosives and a racist murder. Asylum seeker centres were attacked, in Joensuu skinheads would force their way into an asylum seeker centre and start shooting with shotguns. At worst Somalis were assaulted by 50 skinheads at the same time.

During the European migrant crisis, 40 asylum seeker reception centres were targets of arson attacks. In its annual threat assessment for 2020, the National Bureau of Investigation found that despite the ban of the NRM, the threat of far-right terrorism had risen and identified 400 persons of interest "motivated and with the capacity to perform terrorism in Finland". International links and funding networks were pointed out as a special source of concern.

On 4 December 2021 Finnish police arrested a five-man cell in Kankaanpää on suspicion of planning a terror attack and confiscated numerous firearms including assault rifles and tens of kilos of explosives. According to the Finnish media the men adhered to the ideology of Atomwaffen and James Mason and used Atomwaffen-like symbols.

In July 2022, a group of youth stole all the rainbow flags from a library in Lapua and left an improvised explosive device behind. There were no casualties, but a gay pride event was interrupted by the explosion. On 26 August 2022 a bomb exploded near a pride in Savonlinna, the police has arrested two locals for the act.

In July 2023 Finnish police arrested five men in Lahti who possessed assault rifles and adhered to accelerationism and Siege and planned to ignite a race war by attacking the infrastructure, electric grid and railroads. The men discussed forming a new Atomwaffen cell and discussed assassinating Prime minister Sanna Marin. It was reported the men had at least planned training in Russia and had met with Janus Putkonen. Later multiple sources confirmed the men had acquired training for the use of firearms and explosives. Additionally the group committed burglaries against left-wing targets. On 31 October 2023, the men from Lahti were convicted of terrorism offenses. A 29-year-old Viljam Nyman was sentenced to 3 years and 4 months. A man born in 2001 was sentenced to 7 months of probation and another man born in 1996 was sentenced to 1 year and 9 months. The fourth man was sentenced to 1 year and 2 months in jail. A man affiliated with the Lahti group is also suspected of plotting a ritual murder and sending a string of letter bombs sent to Social Democrat, Green and Left party offices.

In mid-June 2024, there was a series of racist stabbings in Oulu. One of the perpetrators was on the terror watchlist for connections to the outlawed terror group Nordic Resistance Movement. Another perpetrator was a supporter of the NRM as well. The third attacker was unaffiliated. The three men stabbed several people with a perceived immigrant background, causing life-threatening injuries.

In September 2025, an 18-year-old man attacked a vocational school in Espoo and tried to stab two students who had a foreign background. After the attack, the perpetrator gave a Nazi salute and pleaded police to shoot him. In his manifesto, the perpetrator claimed that he hated sexual minorities, ethnic minorities, muslims, and leftists, and that he wanted to kill as many people as he could. Before the attack perpetrator watched videos of Anders Breivik.

Gallery

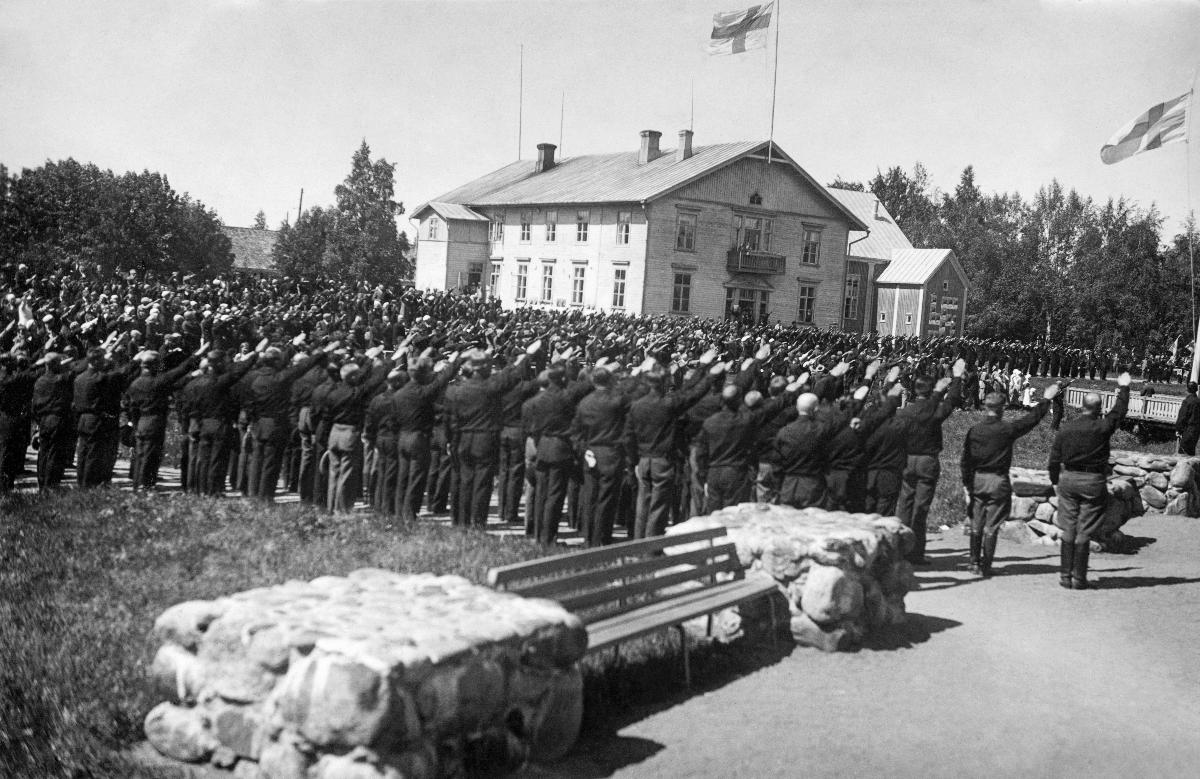
Members of IKL saluting at the statue of Jaakko Ilkka

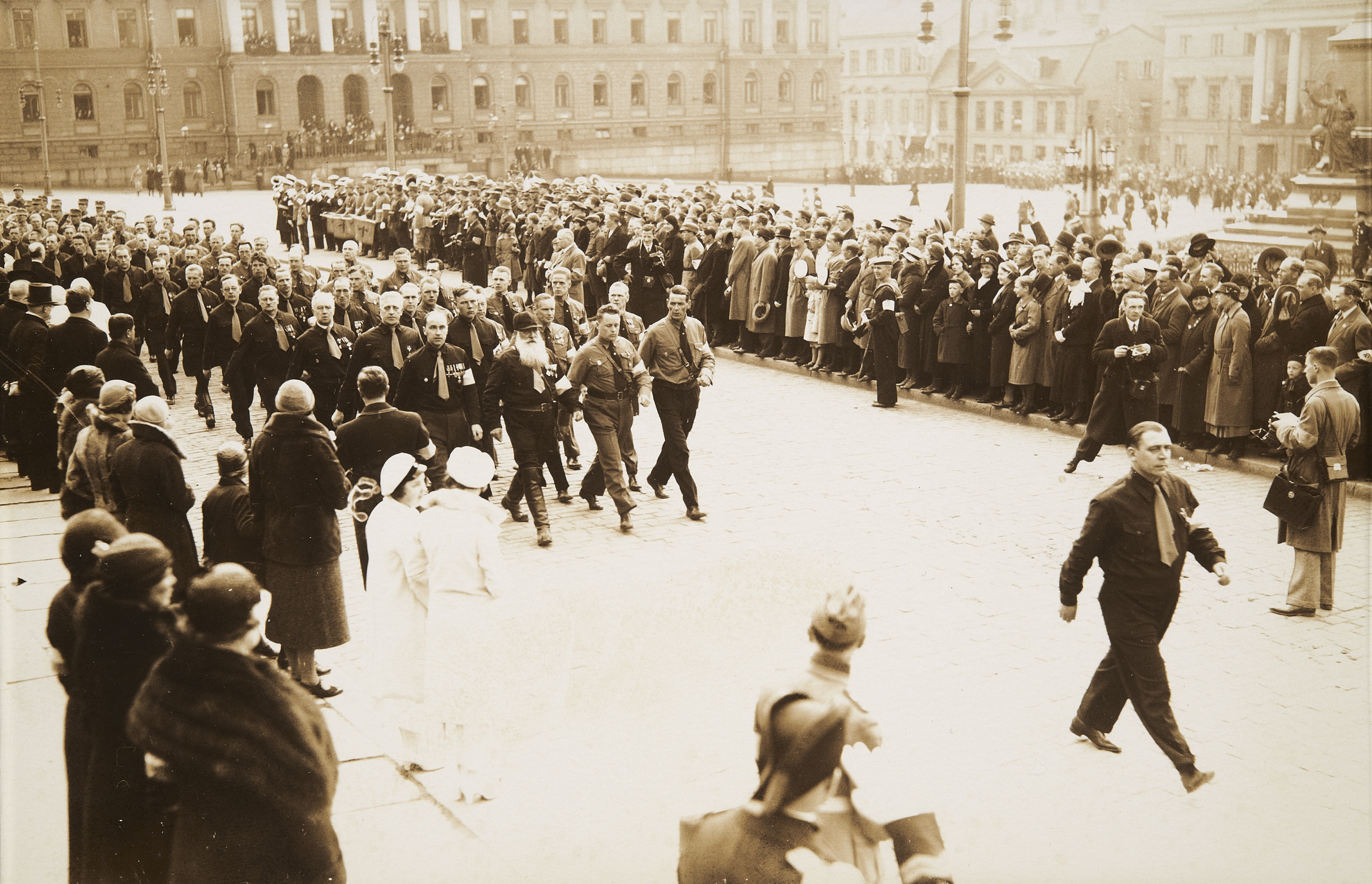
15th anniversary of White Victory Parade, SKJ and IKL marching

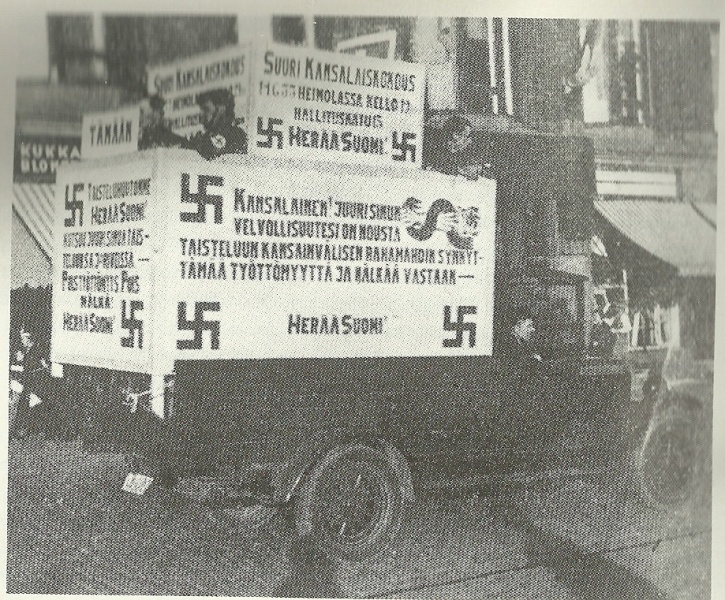
Finnish-Socialist Workers' Party campaign truck

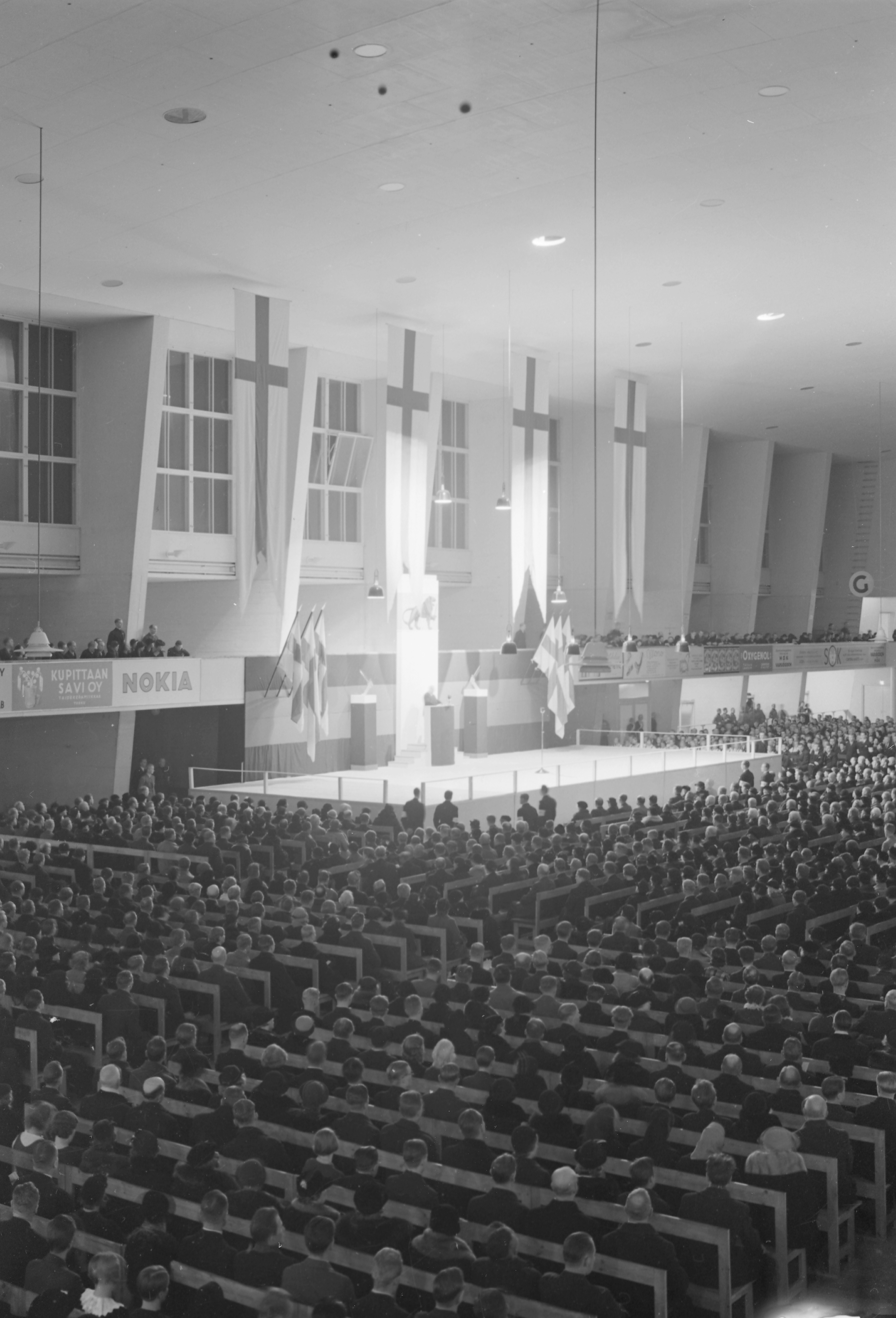
IKL meeting in 1936

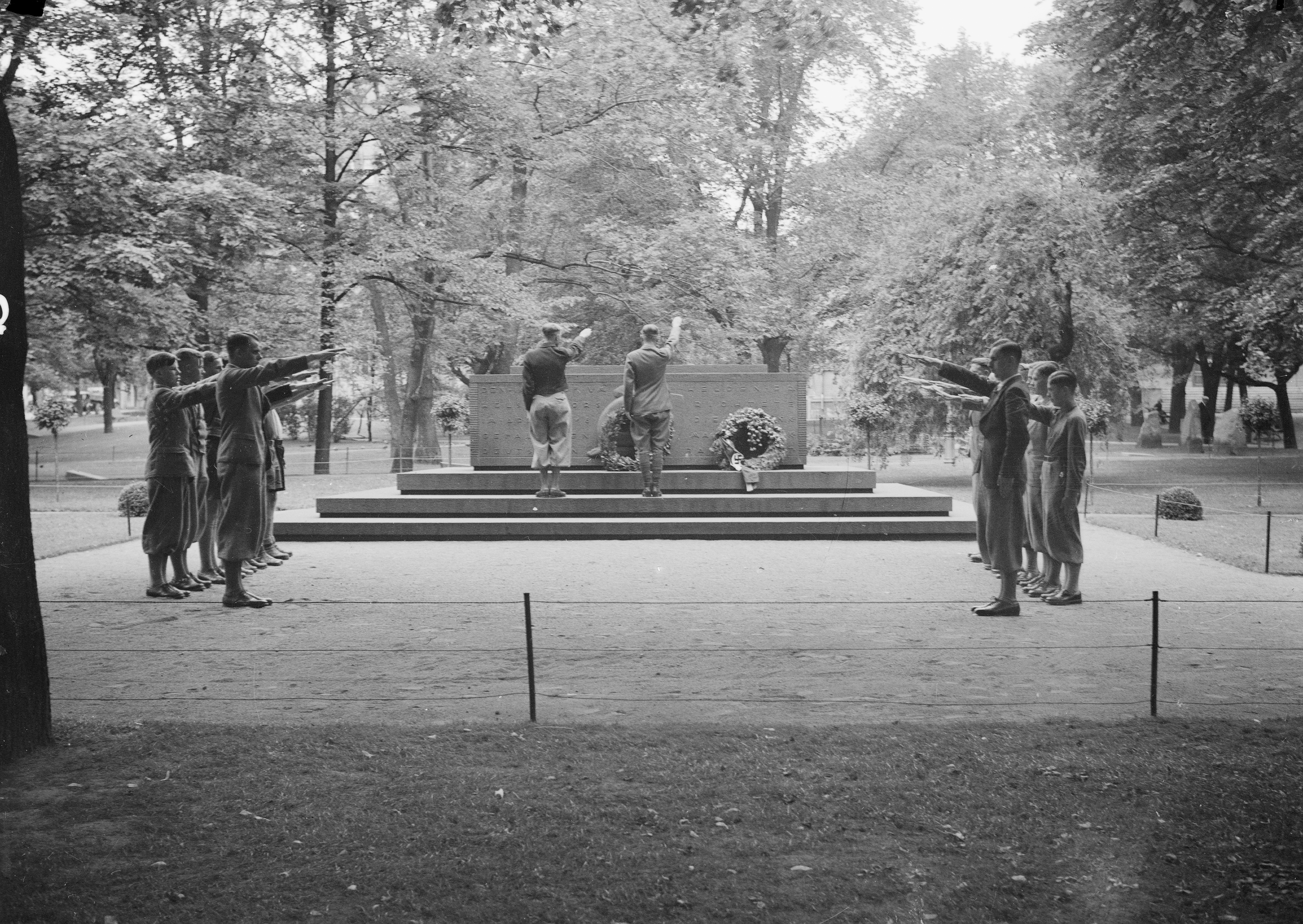
Finnish Hitler Jugend saluting a memorial for German combatants of Finnish Civil War in Helsinki.

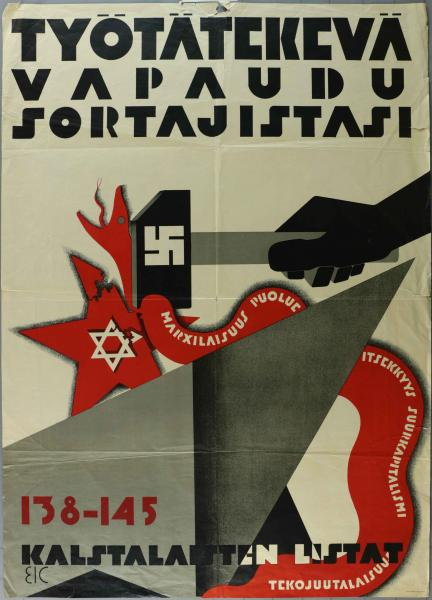
SKJ poster: "Worker, free yourself from your oppressors!"

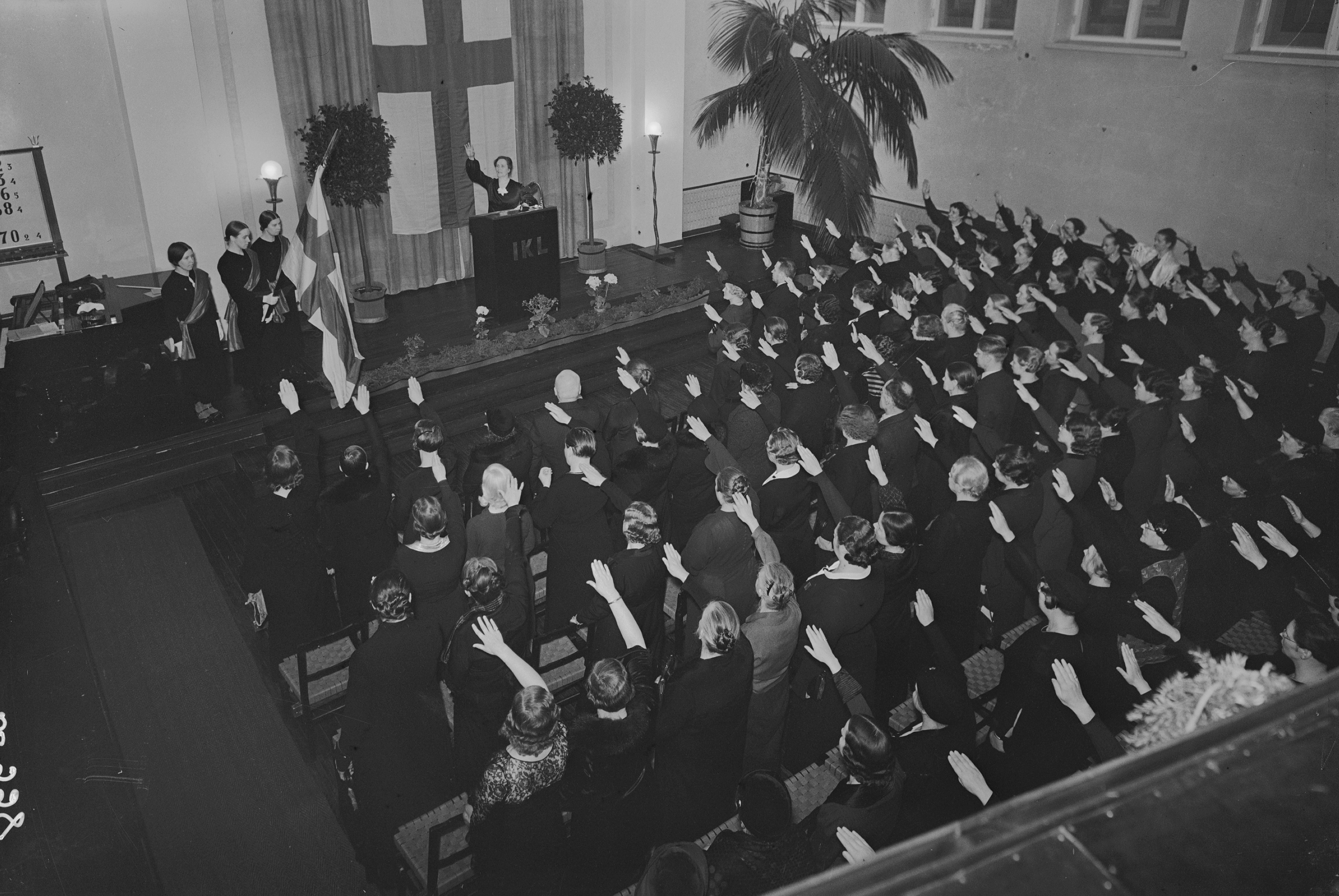
Fascist women's meeting

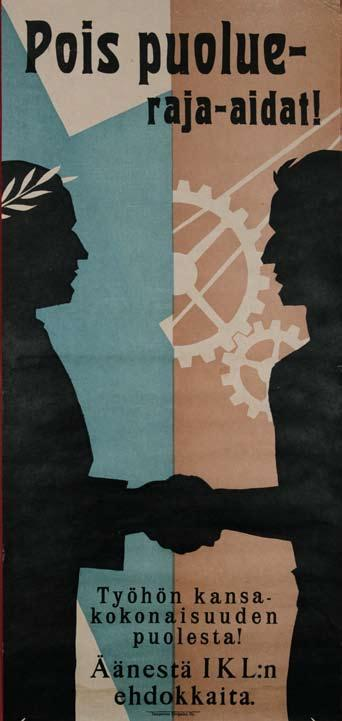
SKA poster: "Away with the party lines! Work for the national community!"

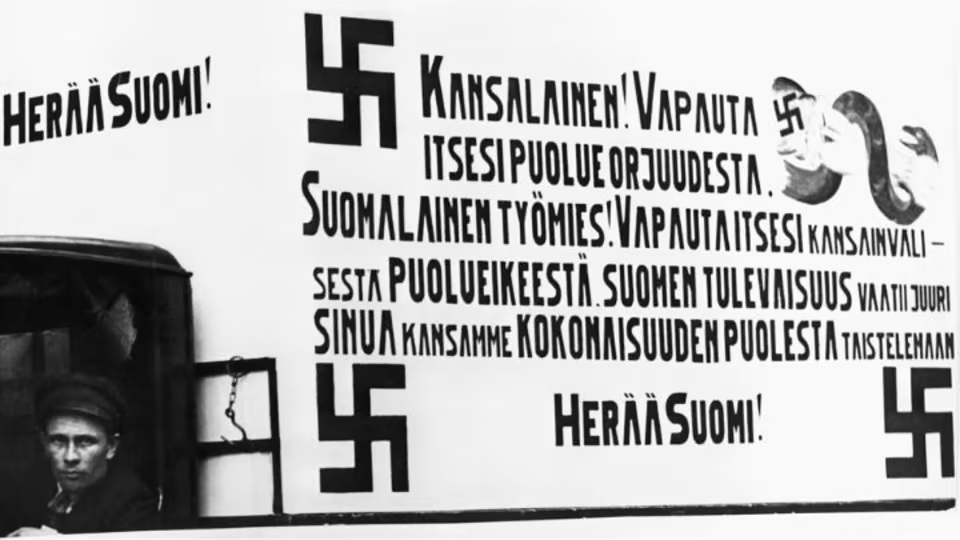
SKJ campaign truck
