= List of political parties in Finland =

This article is a list of political parties in Finland, which includes Finland's national-level political parties and excludes local and provincial parties (such as the parties of Åland). A party is defined as a political association whose existence is recorded in the Ministry of Justice's party register.

Finland has a multi-party system. Coalition governments which comprise a majority of seats in the Parliament of Finland are the norm. Those parties which are not in government are called the opposition. Due to the lack of an electoral threshold, many parties are usually represented in Parliament. As a result, it is all but impossible for one party to win a majority. Additionally, the parties usually cannot win enough seats between them to form a governing coalition on their own. Most Finnish governments, particularly since World War II, have thus been grand coalitions comprising parties stretching across the political spectrum.

Political parties work in parliamentary groups (eduskuntaryhmät) which usually vote with non-absolute party discipline.

Parties are composed of local chapters based in municipalities. In municipalities, which are fundamental administrative units in the country, parties hold seats in the municipal councils, but often have to compete for them with local non-party groups (independents).

Finnish law states that a political association which fulfills certain conditions is eligible to become a political party free of charge. Among these conditions are:

- that the primary purpose of the association is to affect governmental affairs,
- that it has received at least 5,000 votes in any parliamentary, municipal, county, or European Parliament election,
- that the association's rules secure the following of democratic principles in its decision making and activities,
- and that it has a general program based on these rules which expresses the association's principles and goals regarding its actions in governmental affairs.

A registered party may nominate candidates in any national and local elections, and a party that is represented in parliament is entitled to a government subsidy relative to its number of seats. To qualify as a registered party, an association must have bylaws guaranteeing democratic internal organization and must be able to present 5,000 signatures from its supporters who are eligible to vote. A party that fails to win a single seat in two consecutive parliamentary elections is stricken from the register, but may apply again.

== Parliamentary parties ==
Party		Ideology	MPs	MEPs	CCs	Leader	Founded	Ref
National Coalition Party; Kansallinen Kokoomus (Samlingspartiet)	Kok; Saml	Liberal conservatism	48 / 200	4 / 15	1,592 / 8,586	Petteri Orpo	1918	
Finns Party; Perussuomalaiset (Sannfinländarna)	PS; Sannf	National conservatism; Right-wing populism	46 / 200	1 / 15	651 / 8,586	Riikka Purra	1995	
Social Democratic Party; Sosialidemokraatit (Socialdemokraterna)	SDP	Social democracy	43 / 200	2 / 15	1,699 / 8,586	Antti Lindtman	1899	
Centre Party; Suomen Keskusta (Centern i Finland)	Kesk; C	Agrarianism (Nordic); Liberalism	22 / 200	2 / 15	2,623 / 8,586	Antti Kaikkonen	1906	
Green League; Vihreä liitto (Gröna förbundet)	Vihr	Green politics	13 / 200	2 / 15	418 / 8,586	Sofia Virta	1987	
Left Alliance; Vasemmistoliitto (Vänsterförbundet)	Vas; VF	Democratic socialism; Eco-socialism	11 / 200	3 / 15	536 / 8,586	Minja Koskela	1990	
Swedish People's Party; Svenska folkpartiet (Ruotsalainen kansanpuolue)	SFP; RKP	Swedish-speakers' interests; Liberalism	10 / 200	1 / 15	452 / 8,586	Anders Adlercreutz	1906	
Christian Democrats; Kristillisdemokraatit (Kristdemokraterna)	KD	Christian democracy; Social conservatism	5 / 200	0 / 15	299 / 8,586	Sari Essayah	1958	
Movement Now; Liike Nyt (Rörelse Nu)	Liik; RN	Economic liberalism	1 / 200	0 / 15	19 / 8,586	Harry Harkimo	2018	

== Extra-parliamentary parties ==
=== Registered ===
The parties that haven't received a seat in the Parliament of Finland or in the European Parliament, but which are registered political parties, are listed below.

Party		Ideology	CCs	Leader	Founded	Ref
Animal Justice Party; Eläinoikeuspuolue (Djurrättspartiet)	EOP	Animal rights	0	Tatu Chanth	2015	
Blue-and-Black Movement; Sinimusta Liike	SML	Ecofascism; Ethnonationalism; Remigration	0	Tuukka Kuru	2021	
Communist Party of Finland; Suomen Kommunistinen Puolue (Finlands Kommunistiska Parti)	SKP	Communism; Marxism–Leninism	0	Liisa Taskinen	1994	
Crystal Party; Kristallipuolue (Kristall Parti)	Kristall	Spirituality; Anti-lockdown	0	Sanna Seesvalo	2013	
Freedom Alliance; Vapauden liitto	VL	Right-wing populism National conservatism	0	Ossi Tiihonen	2022	
Hemp Party; Hamppupuolue (Hampapartiet)	HP	Single-issue (cannabis)	0	Tapani Karvinen	2022	
Liberal Party – Freedom to Choose; Liberaalipuolue - Vapaus valita (Liberalpartiet - Frihet att välja)	Lib	Classical liberalism Economic liberalism	1	Lassi Kivinen	2015	
The Open Party; Avoin Puolue	AP	Liberalism; Open government	0	Thierry Botty van den Bruele	2020	
Power Belongs to the People; Valta kuuluu kansalle	VKK	Finnish ultranationalism Russophilia; Vaccine hesitancy	0	Antti Asikainen	2021	
Truth Party; Totuuspuolue	TP	National conservatism Russophilia	0	Jaana Kavonius	2023	

=== De-registered ===
The parties listed below have previously been registered, but have since been de-registered.

Party		Ideology	Leader	Founded	Ref
Kansalaisliitto; Kansalaisliitto (Medborgarförbundet)	KaL	Direct democracy Economic democracy	Päivi Järnfors	1994	
Pirate Party; Piraattipuolue (Piratpartiet)	Pir	Pirate politics Social liberalism	Marek Nečada	2008	
Feminist Party; Feministinen puolue (Feministiska partiet)	FP	Feminism	Lauri Alhojärvi	2016	
Communist Workers' Party; Kommunistinen Työväenpuolue (Kommunistiska Arbetarpartiet)	KTP	Communism; Marxism–Leninism	Sanni Riihiaho	1988	
Change 2011; Muutos 2011 (Förändring 2011)	M11	Direct democracy Populism		2009	

== Historical parties ==
=== Parliamentary historical parties ===
Party	Founded	Dissolved
Finnish Party; Suomalainen Puolue; Finska Partiet	1863	1918
Young Finnish Party; Nuorsuomalainen Puolue; Ungfinska Partiet	1894	1918
Christian Workers' Union of Finland; Suomen Kristillisen Työväen Liitto, KTL; Kristliga Arbetarförbundet	1906	1922
People's Party; Kansanpuolue; Folkpartiet	1917	1918
Communist Party of Finland; Suomen Kommunistinen Puolue, SKP; Finlands Kommunistiska Parti, FKP	1918	1992
National Progressive Party; Kansallinen Edistyspuolue; Framstegspartiet	1918	1951
Liberal Swedish Party; Svenska frisinnade partiet Ruotsalainen vapaamielinen puolue	1919	1951
Patriotic People's Movement; Isänmaallinen kansanliike Fosterländska folkrörelsen	1932	1944
People's Party; Kansanpuolue; Folkpartiet	1932	1936
Finnish People's Democratic League; Suomen Kansan Demokraattinen Liitto, SKDL; Demokratiska Förbundet för Finlands Folk, DFFF	1945	1990
Liberal League; Vapaamielisten liitto De Frisinnades Förbund	1951	1965
Liberals; Liberaalit; Liberalerna	1965	2011
Finnish People's Unity Party; Suomen Kansan Yhtenäisyyden Puolue, SKYP; Enhetspartiet för Finlands Folk, EFF	1972	1983
Constitutional Right Party; Perustuslaillinen Oikeistopuolue, POP; Konstitutionella högerpartiet	1973	1992
Democratic Alternative; Demokraattinen Vaihtoehto, Deva; Demokratiskt Alternativ, DA	1986	1990
Kirjava ”Puolue” – Elonkehän Puolesta; Det Eko-Brokiga Partiet	1988	2003
People's Party of Finland; Suomen Kansanpuolue; Finska folkpartiet	1951	1965
Reform Group; Remonttiryhmä; Reformgruppen	1998	2001
Finnish Rural Party; Suomen Maaseudun Puolue, SMP; Finlands landsbygdsparti, FLP	1959	1995
Small Farmers Party; Pienviljelijäin Puolue; Småbrukarpartiet	1936	1954
Small Farmers' Party of Finland; Suomen Pienviljelijäin Puolue; Småbrukarpartiet	1929	1936
Socialist Electoral Organisation of Workers and Smallholders; Sosialistinen työväen ja pienviljelijöiden vaalijärjestö, STPV; Finlands socialistiska arbetarparti	1924	1930
Socialist Workers' Party of Finland; Suomen Sosialistinen Työväenpuolue, SSTP; Finlands socialistiska arbetarparti	1920	1923
Socialist Unity Party; Sosialistinen yhtenäisyyspuolue, SYP; Socialistiska enhetspartiet	1946	1955
Social Democratic Union of Workers and Smallholders; Työväen ja Pienviljelijöiden Sosialidemokraattinen Liitto, TPSL; Arbetarnas och Småbrukarnas Socialdemokratiska Förbund, ASSF	1959	1973
Young Finns; Nuorsuomalaiset; Ungfinnarna	1994	1999

=== Extra-parliamentary historical parties ===
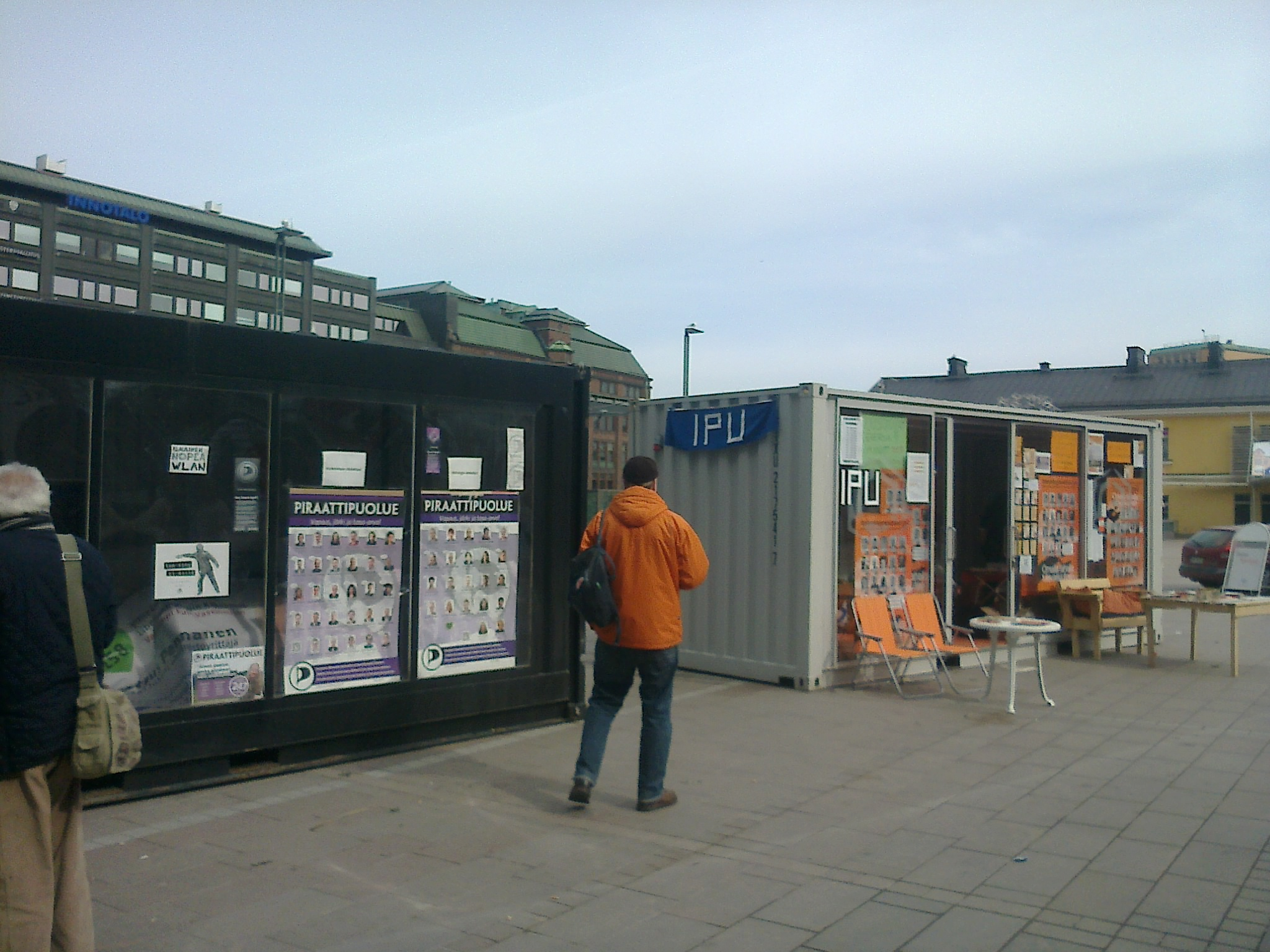
Election campaign stations for the Pirate Party and Independence Party, Narinkka, Helsinki

- Swedish party (Ruotsalainen puolue) 1870–1906
- Liberal party (Liberaalinen puolue) 1880–1885
- Finnish Active Resistance Party (Suomen aktiivinen vastustuspuolue) 1904–1908
- National Workers' Party (Kansallinen Työväenpuolue) 1917–?
- Socialist Party of Work (Sosialistinen Työpuolue) 1917–1919
- Peasant People's Party (Talonpoikaiskansan puolue) 1924–1933
- Farmers' Party (Maanviljelijäin Puolue) 1927–1929
- United Front (Yhteisrintama) 193?–1940
- New Finnish Party (Uusi Suomalainen Puolue) 1932–1945
- Finnish Socialist Party (Suomalaissosialistinen Puolue) 1932–1937
- Patriotic People's Party (Isänmaallinen Kansanpuolue) 1932–1933
- Finnish People's Organisation (Suomen Kansan Järjestö) 1933–1936
- Finnish-Socialist Workers' Party (Suomalaissosialistinen Työväen Puolue) 1934–1944
- Finnish Labor Front (Suomen Työrintama) 1936–1939
- Party of Finnish National Work (Suomalais-Kansallisen Työn Puolue) 1939–?
- Finnish National Socialist Labor Organisation (Suomen Kansallissosialistinen Työväenpuolue) 1940–1943
- Neo-Socialist Party (Uus-sosialistinen puolue) 1940–1945
- Organisation of National Socialists (Kansallissosialistien Järjestö) 1940–1944
- National Socialists of Finland (Suomen Kansallissosialistit) 1941–1944
- Radical People's Party (Radikaalinen Kansanpuolue) 1944–1951
- Independent Middle Class (Itsenäinen keskiluokka) 1949–1951
- Finnish People's Party (Suomalainen kansanpuolue) 1950s
- Independence Party (Itsenäisyyspuolue) 1960s
- Party Organisation of Finnish Entrepreneurs (Suomen Yksityisyrittäjäin Puoluejärjestö) 1972–1979
- Socialist Workers' Party (Sosialistinen Työväenpuolue) 1973–1990
- Pensioners' Party of Finland (Suomen Eläkeläisten Puolue) 1985–1999
- Joint Responsibility Party (Yhteisvastuu puolue) 1987–2007
- Senior Citizens' Party of Finland (Suomen Senioripuolue) 1990–2014
- Women's Party (Naisten puolue) 1990–1995
- Party of Humanity (Ihmisyydenpuolue) 1991–1995
- Finnish People's Blue-Whites (Suomen Kansan Sinivalkoiset, SKS) 1993–2010
- Finland – Fatherland (Suomi - Isänmaa) 1993–2007
- Natural Law Party (Luonnonlain puolue) 1994–2001
- Workers' Party of Finland (Suomen Työväenpuolue) 1999–2018
- Forces for Change in Finland (Muutosvoimat Suomi) 2002–2007
- For the Poor (Köyhien Asialla) 2002–2015
- Blue and White Front (Sinivalkoinen Rintama) 2009–2015
- Citizens' Party (Kansalaispuolue) 2016–2022
- Finnish Reform Movement (Korjausliike) 2017–2023
- Seven Star Movement (Seitsemän tähden liike) 2017–2024
- Finnish People First (Suomen Kansa Ensin) 2018–2023

== See also ==
- Parliament of Finland
- Government of Finland
- President of Finland
- Elections in Finland
- Politics of Finland
- List of political parties in Åland
- List of ruling political parties by country
