= Bertel Appelberg =

Gustav Bertel Appelberg (11 July 1890 in Kymi, Finland – 10 September 1977 in Helsinki) was a Finland-Swedish publisher, CEO of Söderström & Co (1917–1960) and right-wing activist.

== Biography ==
Appelberg's parents were Karl Joel Appelberg and Olga Sofia Saxén. He graduated from the Svenska normallyceum in Helsinki in 1908 and began studies in history of literature at the Imperial Alexander University in the same year. He studied at the Sorbonne in Paris in 1909–1910 and received his Master of Arts in 1912. He served as a teaching assistant at the Helsinki University Library from 1911 to 1914.

He was employed in April 1913 by Söderström & Co publishing company as a language reviewer and proofreader. In 1917 he was promoted to CEO, a position he held till 1960. During the years under his leadership, Söderström focused on publishing several major works such as Herrgårdar i Finland (1919–1929), Finlands Frihetskrig 1918 (1921–1925) and several books about the Jäger Movement. In the 1930s, the publishing house published several works by right-wing extremist authors, such as Jarl Gallén, Örnulf Tigerstedt and Göran Stenius.

Appelberg was active within student circles. He was member of the board of the student union at the University of Helsinki 1913–1914 and of Nylands Nation. He was also active within right-wing circles. He was a member of Aktiva studentförbundet, a right-wing radicalist group, founded by members of the Swedish People's Party and inspired by the Lapua Movement, and its chairman 1931–1939.

He received his doctorate in 1944 with the thesis Teorierna om det komiska under 1600- och 1700-talet, and has published multiple books. He was awarded the title of professor in the early 1960s.

Appelberg was a member of several boards over the years, including the board of directors of Suomen Kustannusyhdistys and the Nordic Book Publishers Council, and the boards of Tampereen Pellava- ja Rauta-Teollisuus Osake-Yhtiö, Nokia Ltd and Pohjoismaiden Yhdyspankki. He was awarded the title of honorary member of the Nylands Nation in 1958 and was also an honorary member of the Jägars Association in Finland.

In 1919 Appelberg married Astrid Alexandra Elfgren, who was strongly involved in the Lotta Svärd movement after the civil war.

== Bibliography ==
- Svensk litteraturhistoria för lärdomsskolor (1921)
- Teorierna om det komiska under 1600- och 1700-talet (1944)
- Gustav Alm - Rich. Malmberg. Historiska och litteraturhistoriska studier 37 (1962)
- De fyra musketörerna. Enligt Alexandre Dumas och i verkligheten (1969).
