= Yrjö Raikas =

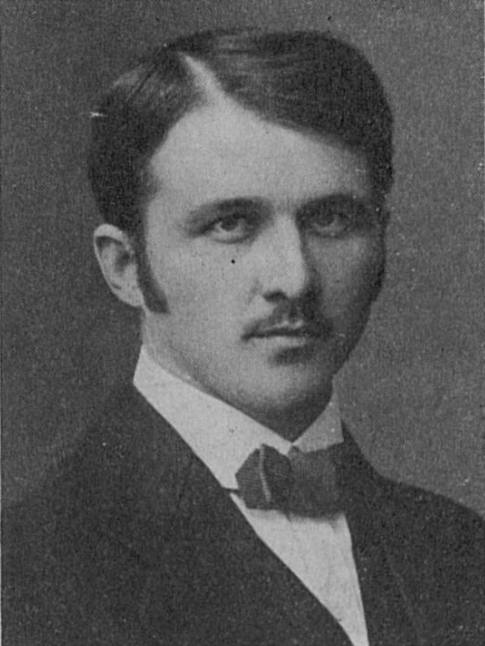

Leader of the Finnish People's Organisation
- In office 1936–1936

Leader of the Finnish Labor Front
- In office 1936–1939

Leader of the National Socialists of Finland
- In office 1941–1944

Personal details
- Born: May 26, 1888 Rapukoski, Russian Empire
- Died: February 10, 1960 (aged 71) Helsinki
- Awards: Order of the Cross of Liberty

Yrjö Ilmari Raikas (former Durchman. May 26, 1888 Rapukoski, Vyborg rural municipality – February 10, 1962 Helsinki) was a Finnish 1930s and 1940s right-wing extremist politician.

== Life ==
Raikas passed the matriculation exam in 1908, graduated as an agronomist in 1913 and graduated as a bachelor of philosophy in 1914.

Originally Raikas had worked as an entrepreneur but his company had bankrupted in the 1930s Great Depression. In the Finnish civil war Raikas fought on the White side as the commander of the second company of the third battalion of the Karelian guard regiment. He was wounded on March 2, 1918. Raikas was awarded ”for his proven cold-bloodedness and courage in battle” 4th class Cross of Liberty. Raikas belonged to the board of the Alliance of War of Freedom Disabled.

== Political activism ==
Raikas worked for a long time with Arvi Kalsta in the 1930s. He led the Finnish People's Organisation after Kalsta left the position. He had already worked as the editor-in-chief of a party newspaper Hakaristi. After a split in the party, Raikas formed Finnish Labor Front with his supporters. In 1941 Raikas formed the National Socialists of Finland and founded the Kansallissosialisti newspaper whose circulation was 11,000. The National Socialists of Finland operated until September 1944, when it was abolished pursuant to Article 21 of the peace treaty concluded between Finland and the Soviet Union. At the same time, Raikas was arrested together with a few other Finnish National Socialists and was ordered to be deported to the countryside.
