= SKJ =

SKJ may refer to:

- League of Communists of Yugoslavia (Serbo-Croatian: Savez komunista Jugoslavije)
- Skj (trigraph), used to represent the voiceless postalveolar fricative /ʃ/, in the Norwegian and Faroese languages
- Finnish People's Organisation (Finnish: Suomen Kansan Järjestö), a political party in Finland
- Thakali language, ISO-639 language code
