= Kohti Vapautta! =

Finnish neo-Nazi organization

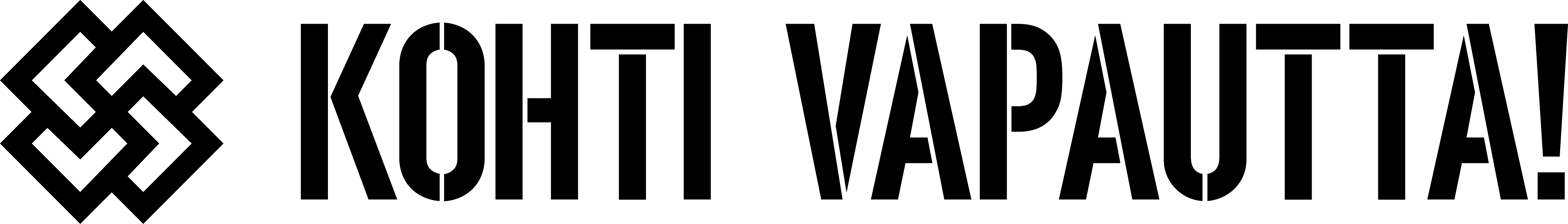
- Founded: 2019
- Dates active: 2019–present
- Country: Finland
- Ideology: Neo-Nazism; Right-wing populism; Ultranationalism; Anti-homosexuality; Antisemitism; Islamophobia; Anti-immigration; Anti-communism; Anti-Zionism
- Political position: Far-right
- Website: kohtivapautta.com (defunct)

Kohti Vapautta! (transl. Towards Freedom!) is a Finnish neo-Nazi organization. It was founded in 2019, and was named after traditional Independence Day rallies.

== Formation and structure ==
In 2016, the Nordic Resistance Movement organized a neo-Nazi march in the Finnish capital Helsinki. Before the next independence day, the Nordic Resistance Movement's Finnish branch was banned by the Pirkanmaa District Court. Organizers of an event described the 2017 march as being organized by independent National Socialists that all National Socialist movements were invited to. In 2018, the Finnish Police intercepted the march and arrested leader of the banned Finnish branch of the Nordic Resistance Movement and three flag bearers, who were carrying Nazi flags.

In Spring 2019, the organizers of the march announced the formation of the Kohti Vapautta! group. The group was formed in anticipation of the ban on the previous group, although the new group was for a time itself expected to be banned. The National Bureau of Investigation suspects the Nordic Resistance Movement to be continuing its operations under the names Kohti Vapautta! and Suomalaisapu.

On November 9, 2019, on the anniversary of the Kristallnacht pogrom, Kohti Vapautta! organized a rally and waved swastika flags in Helsinki. Later that same day, neo-Nazis vandalized Helsinki synagogue and Israeli embassy by tagging them with yellow stars bearing the word "Jew".

== See also ==
- List of neo-Nazi organizations
- Tursaansydän, a symbol incorporated into the Kohti Vapautta! flag
