= Kansallissosialisti =

Nazi newspaper in Finland (1941–1944)

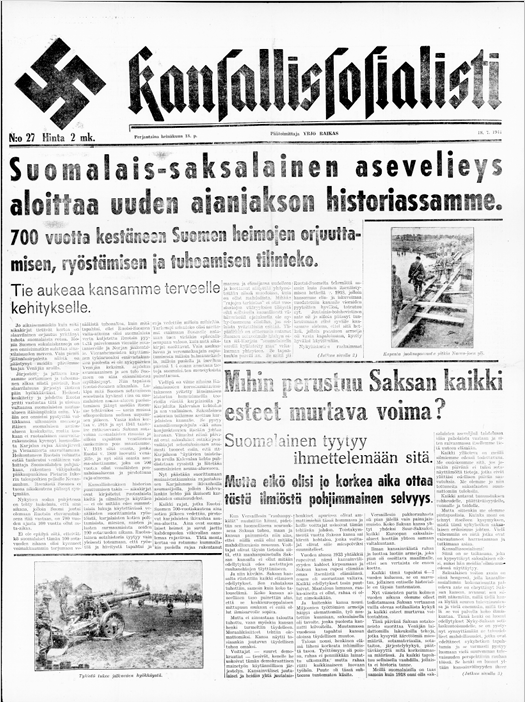
- "Finnish-German brotherhood-in-arms begins a new era in our history. Reckoning for the 700 year long enslavement, pillaging and destruction of the tribes of Finland."
- Type: Daily newspaper
- Format: Tabloid
- Editor-in-chief: Yrjö Raikas
- Founded: 1941; 85 years ago
- Ceased publication: October 1944; 81 years ago
- Political alignment: Nazism
- Language: Finnish language
- Country: Finland
- Circulation: +11,000

Kanssallissosialisti (Finnish: The National Socialist) was a Nazi newspaper published in Helsinki between 1941 and 1944.

The paper edited by Yrjö Raikas was initially the organ of the Organisation of National Socialists of Arvi Kalsta. Later, it was published by Raikas' National Socialists of Finland. The Finnish National Socialist Labor Organisation, led by Teo Snellman, also supported the magazine. In addition funding was provided by the industrialist and Nazi Petter Forsström. According to Kustaa Vilkuna, who led the wartime censorship, Kanssallissosialisti, which went from appearing once a week to every day, was the most hardline and most significant of the far-right wartime newspapers. Its circulation was 11,000. The journal ceased before the autumn 1944 cease-fire and the Armistice Agreement banning fascist parties and newspapers.

Kansallissosialisti was vocal opponent of the Swedish-language Svenska Pressen that was close to the liberal wing of the Swedish People's Party. For example in 1943 when Svenska Pressen had written that Jews are hardworking citizens, Kansallissosialisti denounced it as "supporting the darkest type of liberalism" and that "thanks to the Jew all the dark and corrupting internationalist ideologies and movements have been brought to our country, all the writing, science and arts has been corrupted by them around the world, same as business, scholarship, society and statesmanship".
