= Finnish Labor Front =

Finnish national socialist party

Finnish Labor Front Suomen Työrintama
- Leader: Yrjö Raikas
- Secretary: Sven B. Oksanen
- Founded: 1936
- Banned: 1944
- Preceded by: Finnish People's Organisation
- Succeeded by: National Socialists of Finland and Party of Finnish-National Labor
- Headquarters: Töölö, Helsinki
- Newspaper: Työrintama
- Ideology: Nazism
- Political position: Far-right

The Finnish Labor Front (Finnish: Suomen Työrintama, ST) was a Nazi party in Finland during the 1930s.

The Finnish Labor Front was founded in August 1936 and registered in January 1937. The founders Yrjö Raikas, Sven B. Oksanen and Björn Smeds had previously been active in the Finnish People's Organization.

According to its rules, the ST worked to raise the appreciation for work and to improve the economic and social situation of the state. With the measures, the ST claimed to want to build a foundation for a new, more cohesive civil society. The ST was initially located on Temppelikatu and from the spring of 1937 on Mechelininkatu. Sven R. Hiili was the vice chairman of the ST and Oksanen was the secretary.

ST was formally banned in 1944, although it had shuttered already in 1939.

== Labor Front magazine ==
The ST magazine was Labor Front (Työrintama), whose first issue appeared on October 5, 1936. From the beginning of 1937, the magazine began to appear twice a month. The editor-in-chief of the Labor Front was Sven B. Oksanen. The magazine's articles highlighted work-related issues. The magazine was sharply antisemitic.

In December 1938, Labor Front attacked Foreign Minister Eljas Erkko for supposedly being Jewish. In February 1939, the Helsinki Court of Appeal sentenced the magazine to 40 days' fine for insulting the government. Later in February, Labor Front published a caricature with the text "Solution to the Jewish Question" that showed Jews digging their own graves.
