= Sirpa Kähkönen =

Finnish novelist and translator (born 1964)

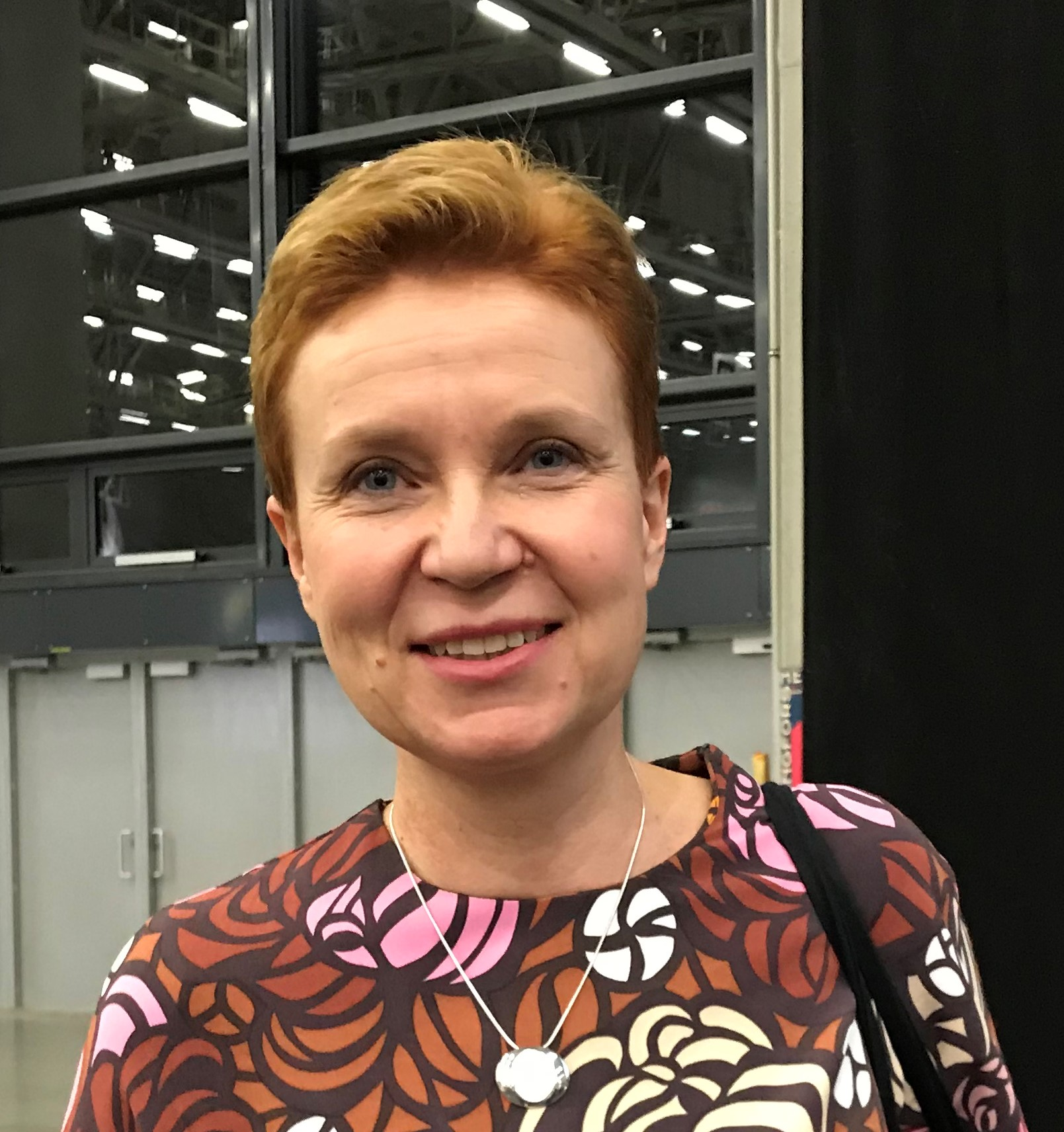
Sirpa Kähkönen at Helsinki Book Fair, 2018

Sirpa Kähkönen (born 15 September 1964) is a Finnish novelist and translator. Initially writing for young adults, she gained popularity in Finland with her Kuopio series of historical novels.

Born in Kuopio, Kähkönen studied literature and history before working as an editor. She embarked on her literary career in 1991 with Kuu taskussa (Moon in your Pocket) for young adults, publishing her first adult novel Mustat morsiamet (Black Brides, 1998), which earned her the Savonia Award in 1999. Her latest work Graniittimies (Granite Man) is a historical novel depicting the lives of young Finns in Soviet times.
