= Thorvald Oljemark =

Finnish manor owner and Nazi (1900–1938)

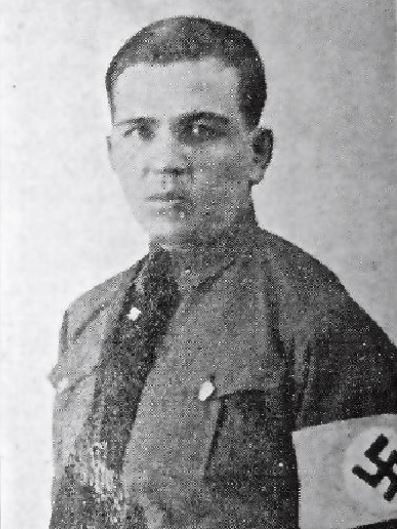

Hjalmar Thorvald Oljemark (24 March 1900 – 25 April 1938) was a Finnish manor owner and a Nazi. He was one of the founders of the Nazi party called the Finnish People's Organisation and also worked as its propaganda chief and editor-in-chief of the party's newspapers.

== Early years ==
Thorvald Oljemark was born in the church village of Sipoo, in the Båskis manor owned by his father Otto Hjalmar Oljemark. Before the start of the Finnish Civil War, he was one of the founders of the Sipoo White Guard at the age of 17 and took part in the Pelling expedition led by Väinö Petrelius after the war broke out, during which 400 members of the White Guard retreated to the Pellinki Archipelago. After the Civil War, Oljemark took possession of Båskis Manor as his father had been executed by the Red Guard.

Before participating in the Civil War, Oljemark had attended the Swedish Lyceum in Porvoo. During the war, he went Vöyri military school and the Fahnenjunker course of the National Defence University. Oljemark served in the army after cadet school, but resigned as early as 1921 as a lieutenant and became a farmer.

== Political activism ==
Oljemark began his political activism in the second half of the 1920s in the far-right Lapua movement. In the same decade, Oljemark had become acquainted in Germany with Heinrich Himmler, who later took over the leadership of the SS and Gestapo. In addition to the ideology, the men were also united by a professional background, Oljemark was a farmer and Himmler an agronomist by training. In 1932, Oljemark started as the managing director of Kustannus Oy Vasara, which published National Socialist and anti-Jewish literature, he also worked as the editor-in-chief of Herää Suomi (Finland Awake) and Hakkorset (Swastika) magazines published by the publishing house.

In 1932, Oljemark visited Germany twice to learn about Nazi ideology and afterwards had active correspondence with Himmler. Businessman Arvi Kalsta also took part in the second trip, and in 1933 they co-founded the National Socialist Finnish People's Organisation. In the same year, Oljemark was a party candidate in the municipal elections. Oljermark died in 1938, apparently from tuberculosis. His hobbies included fencing, in which Oljemark represented the Helsinki Swordsmen and won the Finnish Championship in 1934.

== Ideological views ==
Oljemark was a fierce anti-Semitist and an opponent of communism and Marxism. In an article published in the journal Tapparamies (Axman) in 1932, he claimed that Marxism was battle organisation of the Jews. According to Oljemark, the Jews posed a threat to the nation-states, but the situation was not addressed because the press was “under the squeeze of Jewish finance,” and thus did not dare to write about the role of Jews in communism, for example. Oljemark also saw that Finland was under the rule of international Jewish capital, to which it had been driven by the Social Democrats, left-wing bourgeois, and Freemasons. According to Oljemark, the Jewish list of sins was “long and varied”.
