= Organisation of National Socialists =

Organisation of National Socialists Kansallissosialistien Järjestö
- Leader: Arvi Kalsta
- Founded: 1940; 86 years ago
- Dissolved: 1944; 82 years ago
- Preceded by: Finnish People's Organisation
- Headquarters: Kruununhaka, Helsinki
- Newspaper: Kansallissosialisti
- Ideology: Nazism; Anti-Communism
- Political position: Far-right

The Organisation of National Socialists (Finnish: Kansallissosialistien Järjestö, KSJ) was a Finnish Nazi party operating in 1940–1944. It was founded and led by Arvi Kalsta, and the party was a continuation of Kalsta's earlier party Finnish People's Organisation. The party board included Yrjö Raikas, Väinö Kari, Reino Rauanheimo and Eino Hanhivaara. Jäger Major Onni Kohonen was also one of the closest associates of Kalsta and active in the party.

KSJ's Helsinki district began operations in the winter of 1941. The organization in particular received support in Sörnäinen. Local chapters were established in Porvoo, Pori, Hyvinkää and Riihimäki. The party had a daily newspaper, Kansallissosialisti (National Socialist). In the spring of 1941, KSJ was involved in recruiting Finns to the SS. The party's efforts were led by Väinö Kari. The party was funded by wealthy businessman Eino Partanen. KSJ was part of the Finnish Realm Union's effort to unite all pro-German groups. KSJ had a paramilitary group modelled after the Sturmabteilung, led by Björn Smeds.

KSJ had an especially close relationship with the Nazi People's Community Society that Kalsta viewed as their Swedish-language sister organisation. SKJ was abolished on 23 September 1944, pursuant to Article 21 of the ceasefire agreement between Finland and the Soviet Union that forbade fascist parties, on the same day as the agreement was approved and entered into force.

== Sources ==
- Henrik Ekberg (1991). Führerns trogna följeslagare. Den finländska nazismen 1932–1944. Schildts. pp. 188–194. 951-50-0522-1.
