= Patriotic People's Party =

Patriotic People's Party Isänmaallinen Kansanpuolue
- Leader: Ernest Hedborg
- Secretary: Rafael Svinhufvud
- Founded: 1932
- Ideology: Nazism
- Political position: Far-right

The Patriotic People's Party (Finnish: Isänmaallinen Kansanpuolue, IKP) was a Finnish Nazi party in the early 1930s, led by mason Ernest Hedborg.

The IKP was preceded by the Congress of the National Workers' Party, formed in the autumn of 1931. IKP was founded on 16 March 1932. Hedborg, the chairman of the Free Workers' Union, was elected chairman of the party and Rafael Svinhufvud was elected party secretary. IKP was the first of the many National Socialist parties founded in Finland.

The IKP party program was published on December 3, 1932 at a meeting in Helsinki. The authors of the program were greatly influenced by the programs of the German Nazis and Italian fascists. The IKP, for example, supported strong leadership and wanted to end parliamentarism. Instead, the party supported the elected head of state having strong executive powers. The party wanted to protect the Finnish race, and it called for the immigration and entry of "Jews and other destructive foreigners" to be prevented. IKP also supported a corporatist economic model. The party used a flag decorated with a swastika as its symbol. The party published its own newspaper.

The former Freemason, author Örnulf Tigerstedt, became a member of the party, but at the same time it was stressed that he could not rise to a leading position in it.

According to the rules of the IKP, the party consisted of central, district and local organizations. IKP also had a women's organization and a youth organization led by Jaakko Somersalo. According to Somersalo, Benito Mussolini was a good role model for Finnish youth as well.

== Sources ==
- Talonen, Jouko (1993). Esikoislestadiolaisuus ja suomalainen yhteiskunta 1900-1944. Helsinki: Suomen Kirkkohistoriallinen Seura. ISBN 951-9021-93-0.
