= Örnulf Tigerstedt =

Finnish politician and writer (1900–1962)

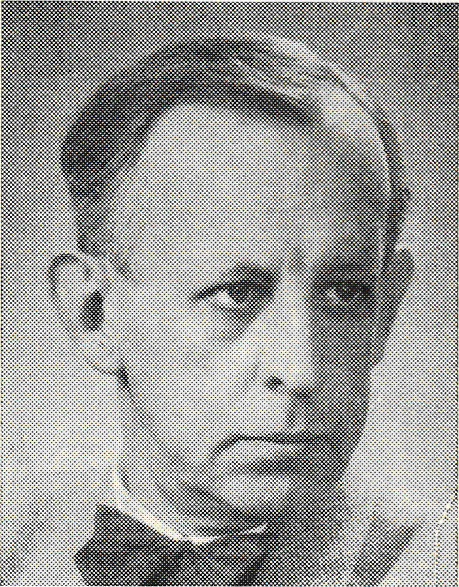
- Tigerstedt in c. 1953
- Born: 22 September 1900; Helsinki, Grand Duchy of Finland
- Died: 6 November 1962 (aged 62); Strängnäs, Sweden
- Occupations: Poet; novelist; journalist; translator
- Political party: Patriotic People's Party
- Movement: National Socialism

Axel Örnulf Tigerstedt (29 September 1900 – 6 November 1962) was a Swedish-speaking Finnish poet, novelist, translator, journalist and a supporter of Nazism before and during the Second World War. He lived and worked in Sweden from 1944 until his death.

== Biography ==
Tigerstedt was born in Helsinki, Finland, into the family of the scientist, geologist and dendrologist Axel Fredrik Tigerstedt and Mary Helene Florence von Schoultz. He had a sister Maria and brothers Göran, Karl Gustav Ludwig, Axel Olof and Erik, a brilliant inventor. He was married twice; first to Hilma Theresia Löfhjelm from 1927 until their divorce in 1931, and then to Giulia Annita Catani from 1934. In his work he used the pseudonyms Axel Fredriksson, as a reference to Scandinavian patronymic naming system, and Axel Falander, his ancestors' former family name until 1691 when they were ennobled with the name Tigerstedt.

In 1918 Tigerstedt began publishing, and in 1919 he graduated from the Swedish Normal Lyceum in Helsinki. Since the 1920s he worked with various mass media; from 1927 to 1930, he was employed at the Finnish Advertising Center (Suomen mainoskeskus). For a long time he worked in the propaganda industry; in particular, he took part in the work of the Finnish censorship and propaganda organ State Information Service. In the early 1930s, Tigerstedt joined the Nazi Patriotic People's Party. He was deputy chairman of the Dante Alighieri Society and headed the Finnish PEN-club, serving on its board of directors from 1934 to 1939 and as its vice-chairman from 1937 to 1938. In 1942, on the initiative of Goebbels, the European Association of Writers (German: Europäische Schriftsteller-Vereinigung, ESV) was founded. The group had about 40 prominent Finnish authors, including Mika Waltari, Tito Colliander, Jarl Hemmer and Maila Talvio. In the interwar and war years, Tigerstedt was the main ideologue of a group of young right-wing extremists called the Black Guard.

In the early autumn of 1944, Tigerstedt, who risked being prosecuted for his Nazi activities, was forced to emigrate to Sweden. He died at the age of 62 in Strängnäs, Sweden, in 1962.

== Works ==
The experiences of the Civil War in Finland and the strong conservatism of family traditions greatly influenced the formation of Tigerstedt as a writer, and subsequently prompted him to become a supporter of Nazism. With the classical contradiction between culture and nature at the heart of his worldview, the young writer adopted the teachings of such philosophers as Oswald Spengler and Lothrop Stoddard.

In 1918, Tigerstedt published his first collection of poems, Vågor, designated, like the two subsequent books, Noveller and Exercitia, as an apprenticeship to and imitation of Verner von Heidenstam. His real success was brought by two poetry collections, Vid gränsen (1928) and Block och öde (1931) with modernist-colored lyrics, characteristic of aestheticism. In the thirties, Tigerstedt was considered one of the greatest modernists in Sweden and Finland. Subsequently, the collections of essays Skott i överkant (1934) and Utan örnar (1935) were published. Tigerstedt has been described as "the lyrical standard-bearer of fascism and Nazism in Swedish-speaking countries".

In both poetry and prose Tigerstedt had an inherent admiration for power. This is especially noticeable in Heliga vägarna (1933), where the author praises Marcus Aurelius for defeating the Marcomans, and in Sista etappen (1940). The poem "The Prince" from this latest collection contains the following words:

Where there is justice, there is truth.
Bent necks greet the banners of the victors,
And the goddess makes the bed in the tent of the winner.

During World War II, the writer's deeply rooted anti-communism was clearly manifested. In 1942 he published the book The Fight Against Soviet Spies in Finland 1919–1939. In the extremely pro-German Hemliga stämplingar (1944), in a threatening tone, discussions are conducted about the future of Europe, warnings about the consequences of possible victory of the Soviet Union in World War II are set forth.

== Books ==
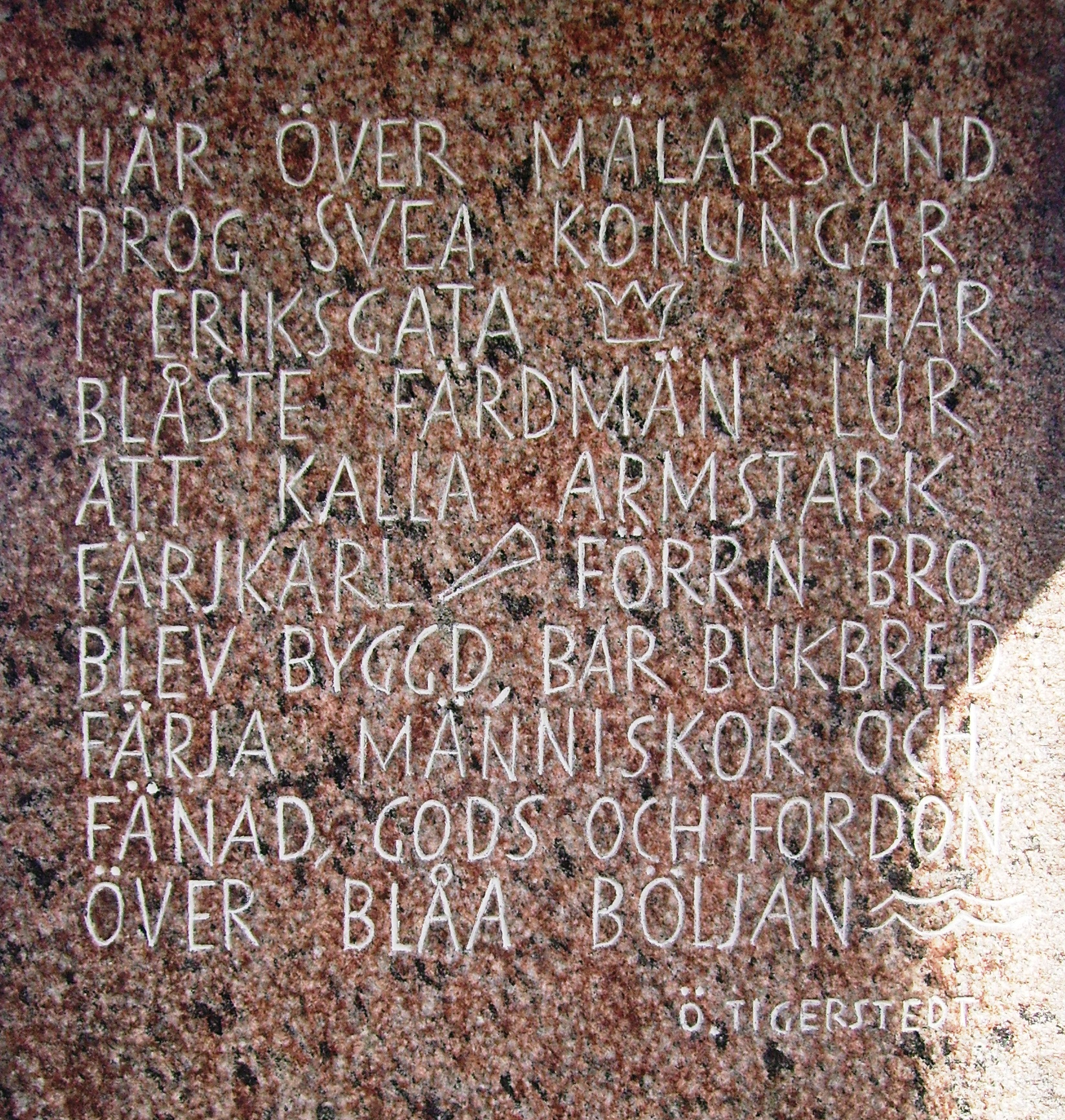

- Vågor. Söderström & Co. 1918
- Noveller. Söderström 1923
- Exercitia. Söderström 1924
- Majoren på Brörnby ett porträtt. Söderström 1928
- Finsk industri och handel (as Swedish text editor). Suomen Ilmoituskeskus 1928.
- Vid gränsen. Söderström 1928
- Vi resa söderut (with drawings by Gregori Tigerstedt). Söderström 1930
- Block och öde. Söderström 1931
- Heliga vägarna. Söderström 1933
- Skott i överkant. Söderström 1934
- Utan örnar. Söderström 1935
- 105 taistelun päivää: Suomen ja Neuvostoliiton sota talvella 1939-40, edited by Örnulf Tigerstedt. Itsenäisyyden liitto 1940
- Sista etappen. Söderström 1940
- I Österled en bokfilm om Svenska Frivilligkåren (as head editor). Självständighetsförb. Stockholm 1940
- Finland, landet som kämpade (as editor). Itsenäisyyden liitto 1940
- Finland frän krig tili krig. 1939, 1940–1941 (as editor). Itsenäisyyden liitto 1941
- Huset Hackman en viburgensisk patriciersläkts öden 1790-1879. Söderström part one: Huset Hackman 1790–1849 1940, part two: Huset Hackman 1849–1879 (vignettes by Gregori Tigerstedt) 1952
- Kauppahuone Hackman erään vanhan Wiipurin kauppiassuvun vaiheet 1790–1879. Otava part one 1940, part two 1952
- Statspolisen slår till kampen mot sovjetspionaget i Finland 1919–1939. Fahlcrantz & Gumaelius, Stockholm 1942
- Vastavakoilu iskee. Suomen taistelu neuvostovakoilua vastaan 1919–1939. Otava 1943
- Ein finnisches Bilderbuch (as co-editor). Liihe-Verlag, 1943.
- Hemliga stämplingar. 1944
- Den lycklige Jokern. Söderström 1945
- Katedralen. Söderström 1947 (published under the pseudonym Axel Falander by Fahlcrantz & Gumaelius in 1946)
- Tutein, Peter. Vildkatten frän Saucats (as translator, using the pseudonym Axel Fredriksson). Fahlcrantz & Gumaelius 1947
- Floden rinner förbi. Söderström 1948
- Tutein, Peter. Byn vid havet (as translator, using the pseudonym Axel Fredriksson). Söderström 1948
- Det ekar under valven bilder och gestalter ur Hässelbyholms historia. Fahlcrantz & Gumælius, Stockholm 1949
- Fälld vindbrygga. Söderström 1950
- Valv och båge, valda dikter. Söderström 1951
- Waltari, Mika. Mikael Hakim (as translator). Söderström, 1951.
- Den blå porten. Söderström 1953
- Ön i havet. Vandringar på Bornholm (cover and vignettes by Birger Etson Birger). Söderström 1955.
- Fagerstabrukens historia del 4: Kavalkad. 1957
- Floden av eld och järn. Gestalter och öden ur Fagerstabrukens historia. Uppsala, 1957. (An extract from Fagerstabrukens historia)
- Källorna sorlar i väster: färder i Sverige. Tomas förlag, Strängnäs 1964
