= Arvi Kalsta =

Finnish politician (1890–1982)

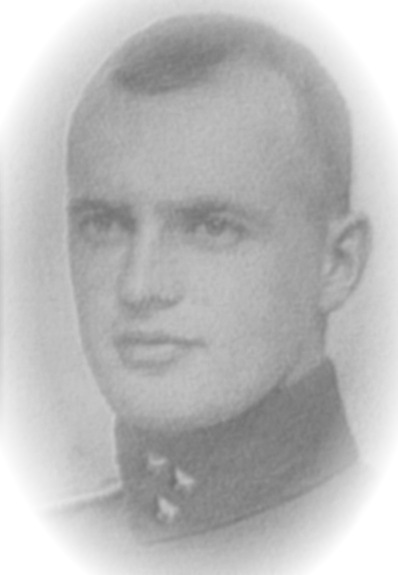

Arvi Kalsta (until 1927 Arvid Daniel Grönberg, 14 October 1890 – 25 May 1982) was a Finnish Jaeger captain, the founder of the Nazi Finnish People's Organisation and a businessman. In the 1930s, the Finnish Nazis who belonged to his supporters were called Kalstaites.

== Early life ==
Kalsta was born in Joensuu. His parents were master builder Bror Gustaf Adolf Grönberg and Ida Sofia Skutnabb. Grönberg enrolled as a student at the Joensuu Classical Lyceum in 1912 and joined the Karelian Association. He studied at the Department of Mechanical Engineering at the Helsinki University of Technology from 1912 to 1915, but did not complete a degree. He later studied without graduating from the Faculty of Law of the University of Helsinki in 1931–1932.

Kalsta married Elin Impi Tika in 1920, whom he divorced in 1937; he remarried in 1939 to Kerttu Annikki Savolainen.

== In Germany ==
Grönberg joined one of the first 55 jäger volunteers to join the Lockstedter Jäger training camp in northern Germany. He enrolled in the camp on 25 February 1915. He was placed in the 1st Company of the 27th Jäger Battalion, from 9 November 1915, from which he was transferred to the 3rd Company of the Battalion.

Grönberg took part in the battles of the First World War on the eastern front of Germany on the Misse River and the Gulf of Riga, from where he was sent for special missions to northern Sweden and Finland from 4 December 1916 to 14 October 1917. After returning from Finland, he completed the A-course of a military school held in Libau in 1917.

== Finnish Civil War ==
Grönberg arrived in Finland after being promoted to captain on 25 February 1918. He joined the Finnish civil war as the commander of 2nd company of the 1st Jäger battalion of the 1st Jäger regiment. Grönberg took part in the battles of the Civil War in Tampere, Kämärä and Vyborg. He was appointed commander of the White Guard Jäger battalion after the Civil War. Kalsta's military career at the time was cut short after he shot an armed Polish prisoner of war who'd received special permission to carry a weapon by Carl Gustaf Emil Mannerheim. Although Kalsta received an extremely lenient sentence of 30 days, he resigned from the army months later.

== Political activism ==
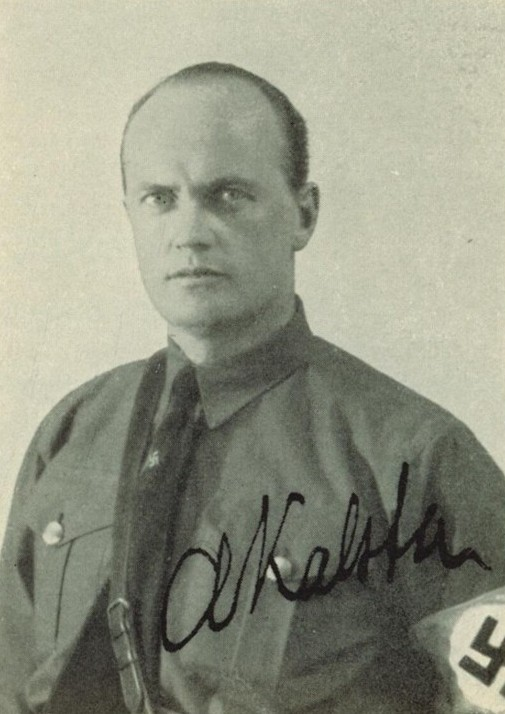
Arvi Kalsta in 1933

In 1929 Kalsta agreed to lead the Lalli Alliance of Finland. Kalsta was part of the Lapua movement's group, which kidnapped the Social Democrat Deputy Speaker of Parliament and the Mayor of Tampere, Väinö Hakkila, from 17 to 18 July 1930. Kalsta captured Hakkila at his summer residence in Teisko and transported him via Lapua to Kuortane, where Hakkila was beaten and forced to sit in an anthill, among other things. Kalsta was convicted and served time in prison for kidnapping, albeit his accomplices were all released on probation.

On 10 September 1932 Kalsta traveled to Germany with Thorvald Oljemark to get acquainted with the activities of the East Prussian District Staff of the German National Socialist Workers' Party (NSDAP). He was influenced by the activities of the Nazi Party, including the election campaign, and became acquainted with the party's internal organizational and propaganda work. He returned from Germany on 30 November 1932.

On 2 December 1932 Kalsta and his comrades founded the Finnish People's Organisation (SKJ). Through the party he founded, he was a guest of the NSDAP in Germany several times: including in 1935, when he attended NSDAP political courses and took part in the local labor service, as well as being in contact with local political representatives. The SKJ had 20,000 members at its peak.

From 1936 to 1938 Kalsta was the CEO of Rovaniemi Hotel Pohjanhovi. After returning from Rovaniemi to Helsinki, Kalsta also returned to politics. In 1940, he and his supporters founded the Organisation of National Socialists (KSJ). The new party used SKJ's old program and involved many who had previously been members of the SKJ.

== Winter and Continuation Wars ==
Kalsta was to be an office officer in the staff of the 3rd Army Corps. However, from the Army Corps, he was sent after the start of the Winter War battles as a Regiment Commander to Infantry Regiment 26, from where he was returned to the Army Corps. From the 3rd Army Corps, Kalsta was sent first as an office officer in the 8th Division and then as a battalion commander in the 19th Infantry Regiment. He took part in the battles in Vuoksela and Taipaleenjoki.

After the outbreak of the Continuation War, he was sent as a company manager to the Field Supplement Brigade, from where he was transferred to the Helsinki Defense District Staff and demobilized on 18 April 1942, after which he became a private businessman representing foreign companies in Finland. He died in Helsinki.

== Awards ==
- Cross of Freedom, 3rd class
- Cross of Freedom, 4th class with sword
- War of Freedom commemorative medal with clasp
- Winter War commemorative medal
- Jäger badge
- Prussian Iron Cross 2nd class
- German honor cross of participants of the Great War

== Sources ==
- Ekberg, Henrik (1991). Führerns trogna följeslagare. Den finländska nazismen 1932–1944 (in Swedish). Schildts. ISBN 951-50-0522-1.
- Hanski, Jari (2006). Juutalaisvastaisuus suomalaisissa aikakauslehdissä ja kirjallisuudessa 1918–1944 (in Finnish). Helsinki: University of Helsinki. ISBN 952-92-0042-0.
- Jernström, E (1933). Jääkärit maailmansodassa (in Finnish). Helsinki: Sotateos oy. OCLC 937111884.
- Roselius, Aapo (2007). Teloittajien jäljillä. Valkoisten väkivalta Suomen sisällissodassa (in Finnish). Tammi. ISBN 978-9513138417.
- Puolustusministeriön sotahistoriallinen toimisto, ed. (1938). Suomen jääkärien elämäkerrasto (in Finnish). Porvoo, Helsinki: Werner Söderström Osakeyhtiö. OCLC 58194897.
- Suomen jääkärien elämäkerrasto 1975 (in Finnish). Vaasa: Sotatieteen Laitoksen Julkaisuja XIV. 1975. ISBN 951-99046-8-9.
- Suomen jääkärien elämäkerrasto: I täydennysosa (in Finnish). Jääkäriliitto r.y. 1957. OCLC 560598079.
