= National Socialists of Finland =

National Socialists of Finland Suomen Kansallissosialistit
- Leader: Yrjö Raikas
- Founded: 1941
- Dissolved: 1944
- Newspaper: Kansallissosialisti
- Youth wing: SKS Youth
- Women's wing: SKS Women
- Ideology: Nazism; Fascist corporatism
- Political position: Far-right

Party flag
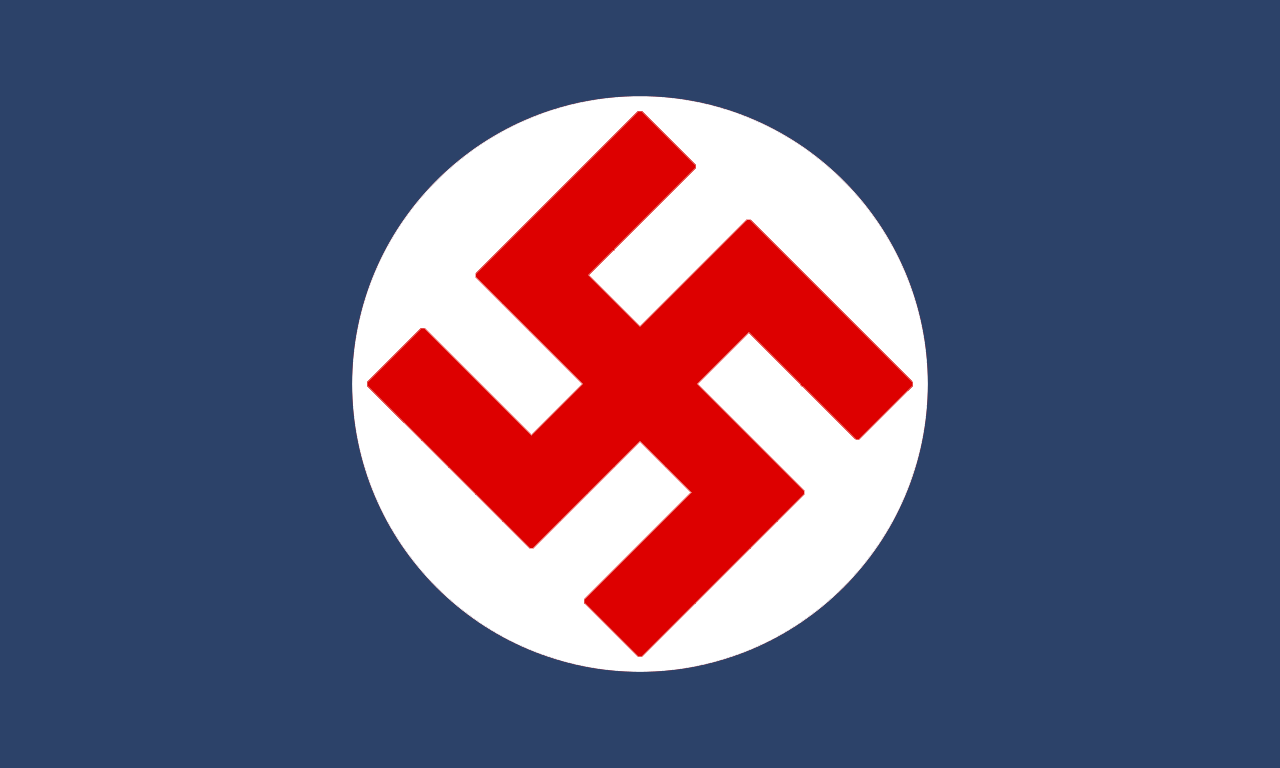

The National Socialists of Finland (Finnish: Suomen Kansallissosialistit, SKS) was a Finnish Nazi party operating in 1941–1944, led by Yrjö Raikas. The party's newspaper was the daily Kansallissosialisti (National Socialist) that was funded by Petter Forsström.

SKS's registered associations – the General National Socialist Association and the National Socialist Support Association – were dissolved under Article 21 of the ceasefire agreement between Finland and the Soviet Union on September 23, 1944, immediately on the same day that the agreement was approved and entered into force.

SKS had local chapters in Helsinki, Turku, Tampere, Hämeenlinna, Jyväskylä, Rauma, Salo, Tikkakoski and Vaasa. Helsinki had multiple chapter. The women's organization SKS Women was founded in March 1942 and the youth organization SKS Youth in October.

== Program ==
The SKS program was published in the July 24, 1942 issue of the National Socialist. The program was inspired by the 1920 program of the German Nazi Party (Nationalsozialistische Deutsche Arbeiterpartei, NSDAP), but the similarities were not quite as great as in some other Finnish Nazi parties. SKS was ready to qualify as Finnish citizens only those who, by "ties of blood, destiny and culture", had "entwined destiny with the Finnish people". According to SKS, the Finnish race had to be kept clean, for example, by preventing "unhealthy marriages". SKS also demanded a living space that belonged to the Finns by "right of healthy blood and instinct", and it wanted Finland to join the German-led "new Europe". Finnish was wanted as the only official language of the state.

The party wanted to overthrow capitalism based on the free market. In the work life, SKS supported corporatist ideas. The Finnish special feature of the party program was the emphasis on the importance of agriculture. In addition to the program, SKS's ideas were presented in Raikas' booklet Democracy and National Socialism (1942).

== Source ==
- Henrik Ekberg (1991). Führerns trogna följeslagare. Den finländska nazismen 1932–1944. Schildts. 951-50-0522-1.
