= Finnish People's Organisation =

Finnish People's Organisation Suomen Kansan Järjestö
- Leader: Arvi Kalsta
- Founded: 1933; 93 years ago
- Dissolved: 1936; 90 years ago
- Succeeded by: Organisation of National Socialists
- Headquarters: Mikonkatu, Helsinki
- Newspaper: Herää Suomi, Hakkorset, Hakaristi
- Ideology: Nazism
- Political position: Far-right

The Finnish People's Organisation (Finnish: Suomen Kansan Järjestö, SKJ) (Swedish: Finlands Folkorganisation, FFO) was a bilingual Nazi party founded by Jaeger Captain Arvi Kalsta. Supporters of the movement were also called Kalstaites after the leader. The inaugural meeting of the organization was held in March 1933 and was attended by about 500 members. SKJ published the magazines Herää Suomi ('Finland Awake'), Hakkorset and Hakaristi ('Swastika', editor Thorvald Oljemark). In addition to its own magazines, the organization had its own publishing house Vasara. The organization wore a brown uniform like the Sturmabteilung of the German Nazi Party, and used the greeting "Finland Awake!" Kalsta was in correspondence with Heinrich Himmler and the German Nazis funded the party.

The party received some support among the Swedish-speaking population of Uusimaa. The organization received only 2,733 votes in the 1933 Finnish parliamentary election, with Jaakko Seise receiving almost quarter of the votes. However, at its peak SKJ had 20,000 members. Due to Kalsta moving to Rovaniemi to run a hotel the party ceased its activities in 1936, but Kalsta resumed his Nazi career in 1940 by founding the Organisation of National Socialists.

Gallery

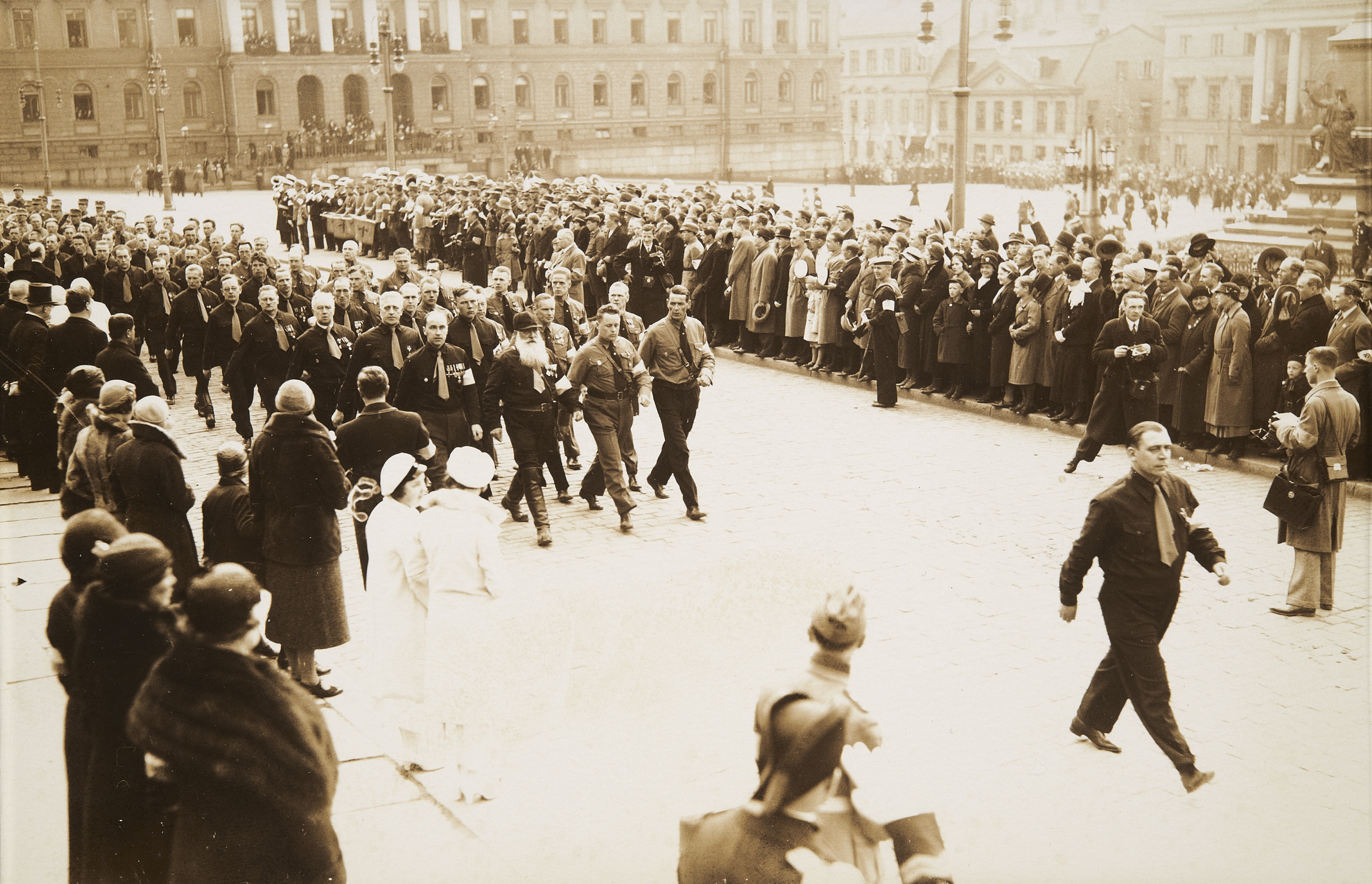
15th anniversary of White Victory Parade, SKJ and IKL marching

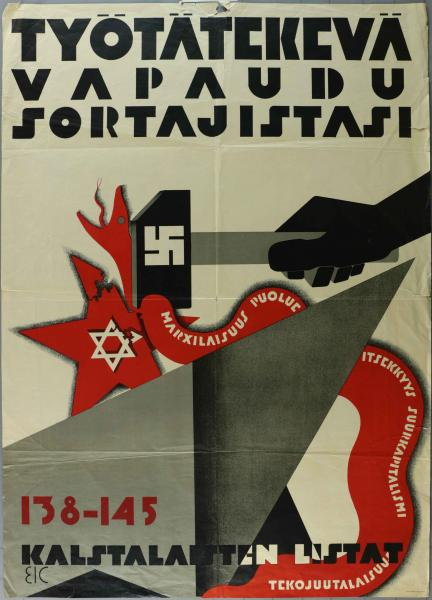
SKJ poster: "Worker, free yourself from your oppressors!"

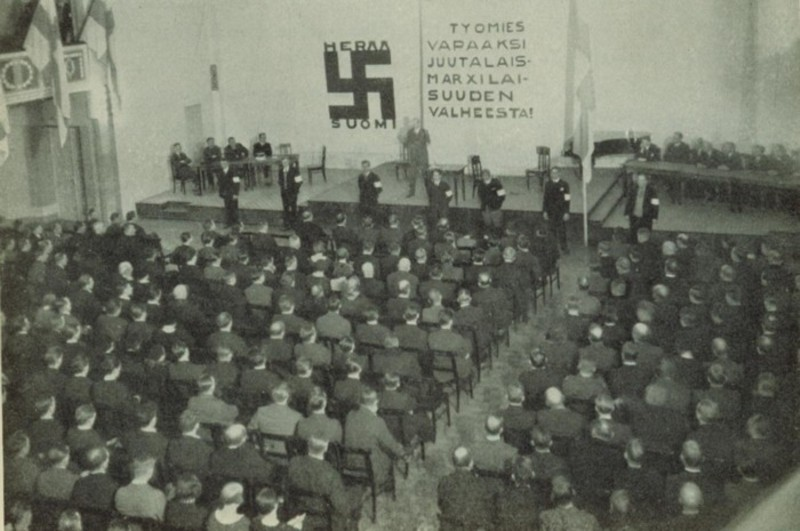
Captain Arvi Kalsta addressing an SKJ meeting

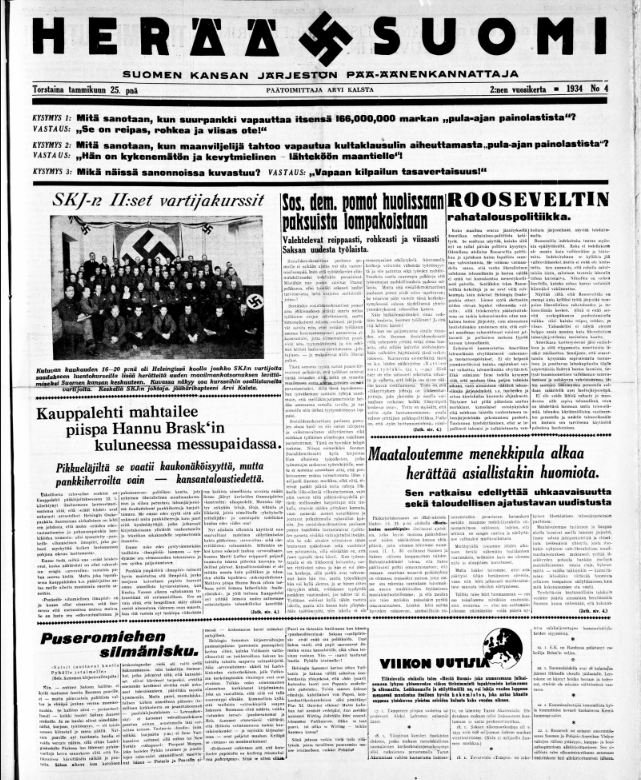
Front page of Herää Suomi

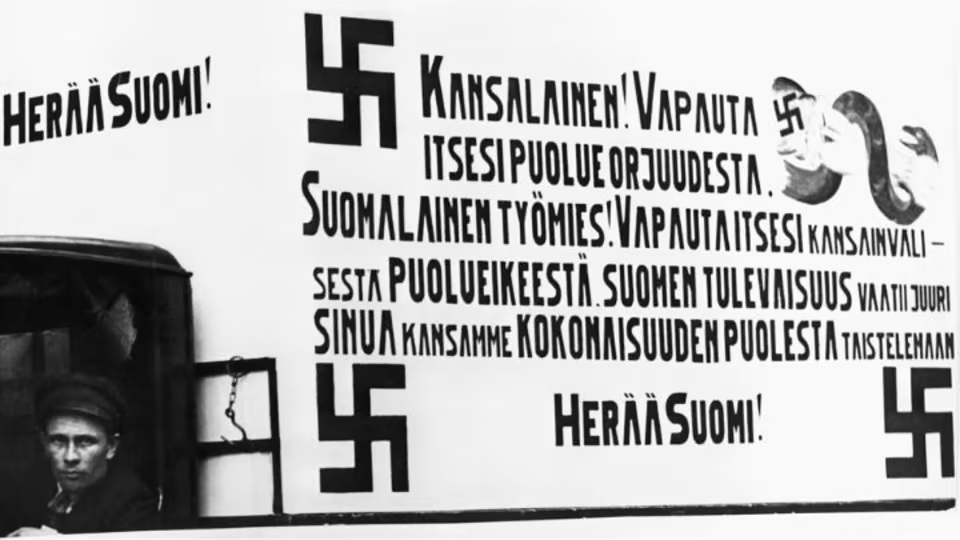
SKJ campaign truck

== Election results ==
=== Parliament of Finland ===
Date	Votes			Seats		Position	Size
Date	#	%	± pp	#	±	Position	Size
1933	2,103	0.19%	+ 0.19	0 / 200	▲	No seats	9th

== Notable Members ==
- Jäger-Major Onni Kohonen
- Judge Kurt Herrmann
- Valdemar Siitoin

== Sources ==
- Hanski Jari (2006). Juutalaisvastaisuus suomalaisissa aikakauslehdissä ja kirjallisuudessa 1918–1944. Diss. Helsinki: Helsingin yliopisto. p. 37. ISBN 952-10-3015-1. online version
