= Gummerus (surname) =

Gummerus is a surname of Finnish origin. Notable individuals with this surname include:

- Herman Gummerus (1877–1948), Finnish classical scholar, diplomat, and one of the founders of the Patriotic People's Movement (IKL)
- Lauri Pihkala (né Gummerus, 1888–1981), the inventor of pesäpallo, the Finnish variant of baseball
- Leo Gummerus (1885–1956), Finnish Lutheran clergyman and politician
- Martti Pihkala (né Gummerus, 1882–1966), Finnish politician
