= Rising Finland =

Rising Finland Nouseva Suomi
- Chairman: Vilho Helanen
- Vice-chairman: Paavo A. Viding, Eero Mantere, Arvo Ylinen
- Founded: 1940
- Ideology: Finnish nationalism Syncretic politics Nazism
- Political position: Far-right

Rising Finland was a Finnish political association founded on October 5, 1940. It aimed to "nurture the Spirit of the Winter War", promote the idea of a united people, to reorganize the bourgeois party field and to create a stronger leadership and increasing personal responsibility. According to the organization, its goal was to bring together citizens around national symbols whose value was "perceived by all our people in the great trials of the 1939-1940 War of Independence".

The organization was founded by Vilho Helanen, director of the extremist nationalist and far-right Academic Karelia Society (AKS), who also served as chairman of the board. Helanen was also a vocal supporter of National Socialism and Adolf Hitler. Many were members of the AKS or the far-right Patriotic People's Movement (IKL). Rising Finland had many influential members in important positions, including Minister of Foreign Affairs Eljas Erkko.

Rising Finland and its program, which borrowed from Nazis, received a lot of positive publicity in the press. Rising Finland was remarkable among a multitude of extreme right organisations in that it supported cross-party cooperation and worked with National Progressive Party, among others. However, Helanen's calls for reorganisation of the state aroused suspicion in some of the traditional parties. In addition, the chairman of the fascist IKL Vilho Annala considered Rising Finland a competitor to his own party. Rising Finland is notable for having formed Väestöliitto, the Family Federation of Finland, together with Association of Finnish Culture and Identity to increase population and promote wellbeing of families, active to this day. The organisation originally strongly promoted eugenics and forced sterilisations.

== Board ==
- Ph. D. Vilho Helanen, Chairman
- agronomist Paavo A. Viding, vice chairman
- Judge Eero Mantere, vice chairman
- Professor Arvo Ylinen, vice chairman
- D.Sc. Reino Castrén, member
- engineer MA Haro, member
- agronomist EJ Korpela, member
- J.S.D. Veli Merikoski, member
- editor-in-chief Yrjö Niiniluoto, member
- Sc.D IO Nurmela, member
- M.Sc. LA Puntila, member
- Director General Eero Rydman, member
- M.Sc. Jussi Saukkonen, member
- M.D. Pauli Soisalo, member
- M.Sc. Erkki Virta, member
- M.Sc. Yrjö Vuorjoki, member
- M.D. Saara Väyrynen, member

== Sources ==
- Pekka Peitsi, Suomen kansan eheytymisen tie Luku 6, s. 48-52
- Nouseva Suomi. Nousevan Suomen julkaisuja N:o 1. Helsinki 1940
