= Vilho Helanen =

Finnish civil servant and politician (1899–1956)

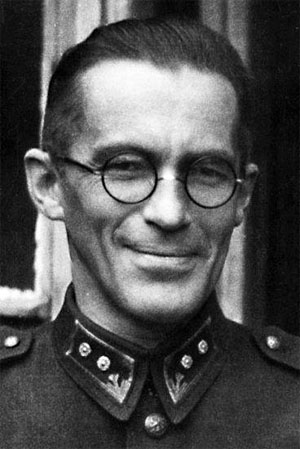
- Vilho Helanen during the Continuation War
- Born: Vilho Veikko Päiviö Helanen; 24 November 1899; Oulu, Grand Duchy of Finland
- Died: 8 June 1952 (aged 52); Frankfurt am Main, Hesse, West Germany
- Citizenship: Finnish
- Education: University of Helsinki (Ph. D.)
- Occupation: Civil servant
- Known for: Political activist, author
- Title: Chairman of the Academic Karelia Society
- Term: 1927-1928; 1934-1935; 1935-1944
- Political party: National Progressive Party

Vilho Veikko Päiviö Helanen (24 November 1899 – 8 June 1952) was a Finnish civil servant and politician.

Helanen was born in Oulu. He volunteered to take part in the Estonian War of Independence in 1919. Helanen was a student as the University of Helsinki, where he gained an MA in 1923 and completed his doctorate in 1940. From 1924 to 1926 he edited the student paper Ylioppilaslehti and around this time joined the Academic Karelia Society. He served as chairman of the group from 1927 to 1928, from 1934 to 1935 and again from 1935 to 1944, helping to turn the Society against democracy. Helanen visited Estonia in 1933 and was amazed at the high levels of popular support for the far right that he witnessed there, in contrast to Finland where it was a more marginal force. As a result, he was involved in the coup attempt of the Vaps Movement in Estonia in 1935.

Helanen was a major inspiration for the Patriotic People's Movement and a close friend of Elias Simojoki, although he did not join the group and instead became a vocal supporter of Adolf Hitler. He formed his own group, Rising Finland, in 1940 which, despite his earlier radicalism, became associated with the mainstream National Progressive Party. Helanen was one of the leaders of the Pro-German resistance movement in Finland.

Rising to be head of the civil service during World War II, Helanen was arrested in 1948 for continuing to collaborate with the Nazis after Finland switched sides. On 6 May 1950, he was found guilty of treason and sentenced to six years in prison. Helanen was pardoned on 3 March 1951. Following his release, he worked for Suomi-Filmi and also wrote a series of detective novels. He died of a heart attack in the railway station at Frankfurt am Main, West Germany.
