= National Trade Union Confederation of Finland =

Trade union of Finland

- Suomen Kansallinen Ammattikuntajärjestö
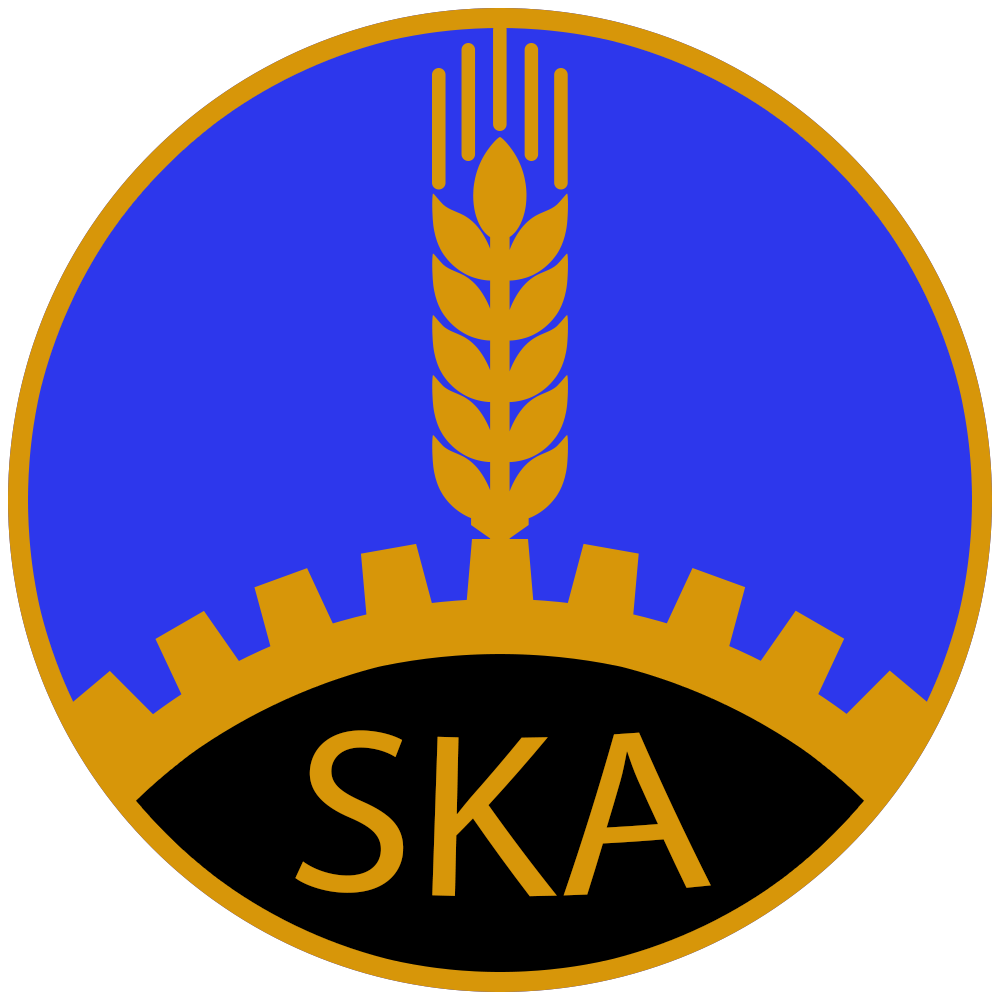
- Abbreviation: SKA
- Founded: 1 April 1935
- Dissolved: 19 September 1944
- Location: Finland
- Chairman: Juho Kaveheimo
- General Secretary: Sulo Laine
- Deputy Chairman: Rauno Kallia
- Key people: Vilho Annala, Eino Tuomivaara
- Affiliations: Patriotic People's Movement

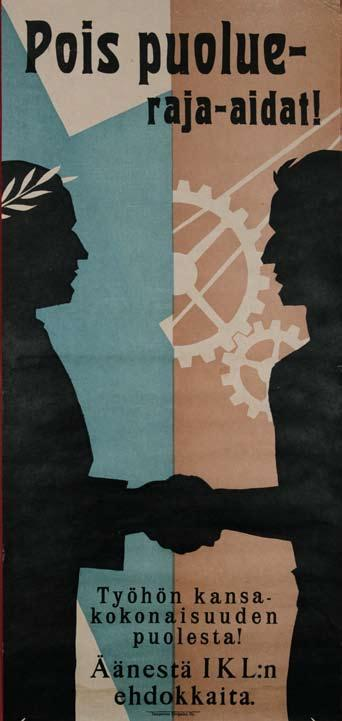
SKA poster: "Away with the party lines! Work for the national community!"

The National Trade Union Confederation of Finland (Finnish: Suomen Kansallinen Ammattikuntajärjestö, SKA) was a Finnish fascist workers' organization affiliated with the Patriotic People's Movement (IKL) which was founded in April 1935. The organization was set up to get the working population to support IKL, and its role models were similar corporatist workers' organizations in Nazi Germany and Fascist Italy. The organization stood out from the Free Workers' Union, controlled by the National Coalition Party and employers, among other things in that it supported the Minimum Wage Act and opposed only “political” strikes, not all strikes in general. The organization also called for the introduction of a labor dispute settlement procedure and for reforms related to workplace democracy.

The motto of the organization was “the benefit of the whole before group and private interests”. It absolutely opposed the class struggle doctrine of the left. SKA wanted to improve the position of the work force in order to create the Volksgemeinschaft important to the IKL. Employers and employees were to be brought together on a professional basis to co-operate and agree on negotiations on issues in each trade. The National Trade Union Confederation of Finland was headed by some former social democratic trade union activists as well as those who took part in the Finnish Civil War on the Red side. Juho Kaveheimo, the chairman of the organization, was a former communist and Red Guard member as was the general secretary Sulo Laine. SKA's deputy chairman was Rauno Kallia, editor-in-chief of Ajan Suunta magazine, and in addition to Kallia, IKL politicians Vilho Annala and Eino Tuomivaara were members of the organisation's board. The SKA was abolished after the Continuation War under Article 21 of the Moscow Armistice banning all fascist organisations.
