= Vihtori Kosola =

Finnish political leader (1884–1936)

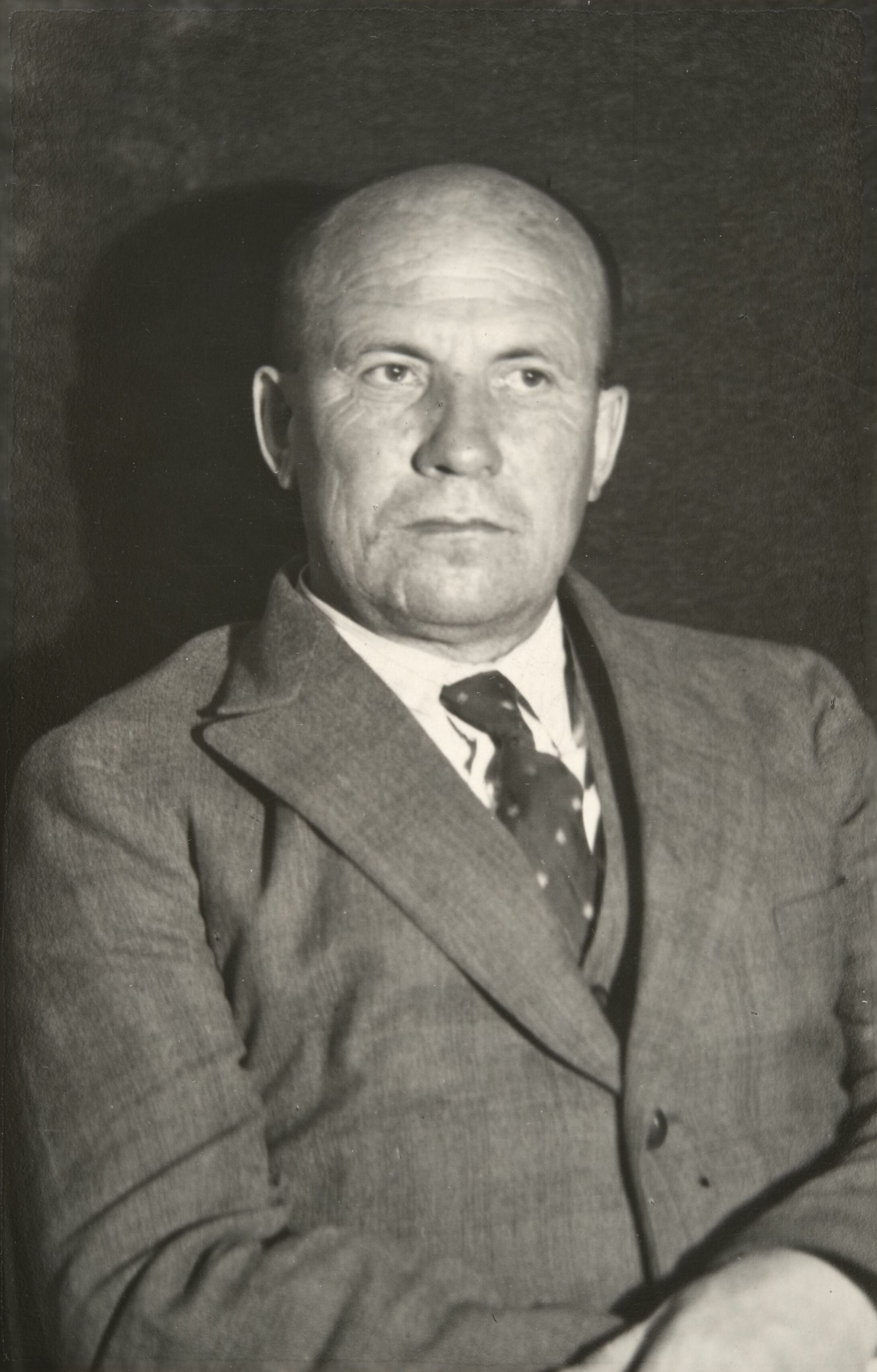
- Born: Iisakki Vihtori Kosola; July 10, 1884; Ylihärmä, Grand Duchy of Finland
- Died: December 14, 1936; Lapua, Finland
- Occupations: Politician; farmer
- Political party: Patriotic People's Movement
- Movement: Lapua Movement
- Spouse: Elin Olga Katariina Lahdensuo (m. 1908)

Iisakki Vihtori Kosola (10 July 1884 – 14 December 1936) was a Finnish politician, activist and farmer best known as the leader of the anti-communist Lapua Movement in the early 1930s. After the movement's failed Mäntsälä Rebellion of 1932, Kosola became the nominal leader of its successor party, the Patriotic People's Movement (IKL), although in practice he served more as a figurehead than as the party's actual leader. He was popularly known as "Kosolini" for his rhetorical resemblance to Benito Mussolini.

== Early life ==
Kosola was born in Ylihärmä, Southern Ostrobothnia to a peasant family. He was the eldest of eight children from his father's second marriage. His family's farmhouse burnt down the next year, and the family moved to Lapua, buying a house at Liuhtarinkylä. His formative years were spent in farming and cattle-breeding following his father's death when Kosola was a teenager, and he took on responsibility for the family farm at an early age. He later supplemented his agricultural training at the Orisberg agricultural college. The Kosola farm in Lapua also operated as an inn (gästgiveri).

During the conscription strikes, Kosola began to become politically active, joining a debate society called Lazy Society in 1902.

== Jäger movement and Civil War ==
From 1915 to 1916, the Kosola farm served as a clandestine staging post for the Jäger movement, where Finnish volunteers heading to Germany for military training stopped on their way north. Around 250 Jägers passed through Kosola before the operation was uncovered by the Russian gendarmes. Kosola's youngest brother was among those who travelled to Germany for Jäger training.

In February 1916 Kosola was arrested and taken first to Helsinki and then to the Shpalernaya prison in St. Petersburg, where he was held until the Russian Revolution of 1917. The Jäger supporters held at Shpalernaya later became known as the "lattice Jägers". Shortly after Kosola's arrest his wife Elin was also detained and brought to Vaasa, but was released after her cousin Jalo Lahdensuo and the Russian-speaking Hilja Riipinen intervened with the gendarmes on her behalf.

After his release, Kosola took part in the Finnish Civil War of 1918 against the Red Guards, serving as a platoon leader on the Tavastia front from the outset. After the war Kosola led the Lapua White Guard. He also joined the Agrarian League.

== Vientirauha ==
In the 1920s Kosola served as the Southern Ostrobothnia district chairman of Vientirauha ("Export Peace"), an organisation founded to break left-wing strikes — particularly in Finland's ports — that aimed to disrupt the country's foreign trade. He recruited workers from his home region for strike-affected workplaces and at times travelled in person to where labour was needed. Otherwise he took no part in politics during the 1920s.

== Lapua Movement ==
In November 1929 a communist meeting in Lapua was broken up, mainly by local schoolboys, and a group of townspeople gathered to consider further action. Kosola initially argued against escalation, but the meeting decided to convene a public assembly — the so-called First Meeting of Lapua — at which Kosola gave one of the opening speeches. The assembly elected a delegation to petition the president, the government and the parliamentary groups in Helsinki, and Kosola was among its leading members both in this delegation and in those that followed. He initially belonged to the more moderate wing of the movement, but became increasingly radical, partly under the influence of Hilja Riipinen.

The movement's high point came with the Peasant March of 1930, which spread Kosola's reputation across the country. The sitting government was forced to resign and was replaced; parliament took up the so-called Communist Laws, was dissolved, and new elections were called. Although members of the Lapua Movement were offered seats in the new government, they declined. The Communist Laws were enacted in autumn 1930, after which public interest in the movement began to wane.

Within the movement's radical wing, Kosola was seen from the summer of 1930 onward as a prospective leader of the country, and the clergyman K. R. Kares proclaimed him to be the leader of the Finnish people chosen by God. Kosola's prominence on the radical right gave rise to a popular Finnish rhyme of the 1930s: "Heil Hitler, meil Kosola" ("They've got Hitler, we've got Kosola"), sometimes extended with the line "muil Mussolini" ("the others have Mussolini"). He acquired the sobriquet Kosolini for his charismatic and vivid speaking style, reminiscent of Benito Mussolini — a comparison Kosola's own followers also embraced. According to some contemporaries, he was widely seen as Finland's prospective fascist dictator.

== Mäntsälä Rebellion ==
The Lapua Movement came to an end with the Mäntsälä Rebellion in early 1932. Kosola's role during the various phases of the revolt is unclear: according to some accounts he travelled to Mäntsälä in order to persuade the rebels to surrender, while according to others he went to continue the uprising. After the revolt was called off in response to a radio address by President P. E. Svinhufvud, Kosola was arrested along with several other Lapua leaders and taken to the prison in Turku. On returning to Lapua he was met by a large crowd of supporters.

== Patriotic People's Movement ==
Once the Lapua Movement had been formally dissolved, its successor initiatives merged into the Patriotic People's Movement (IKL), which announced its intention to continue the work of the Lapua Movement through parliamentary means. Kosola was chosen as the new party's nominal leader, but its actual founders Vilho Annala and Bruno Salmiala regarded his past as a burden, and Kosola never became its real leader; the dominant figures within the party were instead its parliamentary group and its leaders Annala and Salmiala.

In 1936 the IKL delegation decided to transfer the formal leadership accordingly: Annala was elected chairman of the executive, with Salmiala and Kosola as vice-chairmen. The decision effectively ended Kosola's political career. He is reported to have remarked on returning home: "The ticket was no longer valid."

== Death and family ==
Contemporary accounts describe Kosola after his release from prison as a tired and sick man who turned to alcohol to cope with the stress. He was also heavily in debt, and his farm was subject to foreclosure and auction. He died of pneumonia in December 1936, only a few months after his demotion within IKL and before the news of his removal had been made public. Kosola's first son, Niilo, bought the farm and was eventually elected as an MP and briefly served as a government minister. Kosola's second son, Pentti, was imprisoned for murdering a political opponent. Pentti fought in the Winter War (1939–40) as a fighter pilot, but was killed in action.

== Works ==
- Viimeistä Piirtoa Myöten, Lapua, 1935 (Memoirs)
