= Ylioppilaslehti =

Finnish student magazine

Ylioppilaslehti (Finnish: lit. "Student newspaper") is a Finnish student magazine founded in 1913. It is the largest student paper or magazine in Finland with a circulation of 35,000 copies. In addition to affairs related to university studies, it covers areas such as culture and social issues.

== History ==
Ylioppilaslehti was launched in 1913. In the 1920s and 1930s, during which the student union of the university was in total control of the nationalistic Academic Karelia Society, the magazine often took a stance against the Swedish language and communism. In the post-war period the paper oriented towards supporting western democracy whilst becoming increasingly left-wing during the Cold War era. Pentti Saarikoski contributed to the magazine from 1959 to 1960.

The magazine is published by a private company Ylioppilaslehden kustannus Oy that is owned by the Student Union of the University of Helsinki.

== Notable editors ==
- Vilho Annala (1916–1919)
- Vilho Helanen (1924–1926)
- Urho Kekkonen (1927–1928)
- Paavo Lipponen (1963–1965)
