= Juho Kaveheimo =

Finnish worker (1894 - 1945)

Johan Fredrik "Jukka" (Juho) Kaveheimo (born Kavén, June 24, 1894 in Ylistaro - May 28, 1945 in Tuusula) was a Finnish worker who served as the chairman of the fascist National Trade Union Confederation of Finland (SKA). Kaveheimo was a former Red Guard member and communist, who in the 1930s moved to the extreme right.

== Life ==
Kaveheimo was a construction worker by profession. During the Finnish Civil War, Kaveheimo served as chairman of the Malmi Food Board, the Poor People's Board and the Revolutionary Court. After the battle of Helsinki, he escaped with the Red Guards of Malmi via Lahti and Kouvola to Kotka. Kaveheimo was a representative of the Reds in the peace negotiations with the Germans in Ruotsinpyhtää, and he was captured after the Battle of Ahvenkoski at the beginning of May. Kaveheimo received a life sentence in the penal colony, which was later reduced to 12 years. He was paroled in 1922.

After his release, Kaveheimo was influential in the social democratic youth union that was taken over by the communists, and in 1928 he was elected to the municipal council of Helsinki from the lists of the Socialist workers' and small farmers' electoral alliance. In the 1930s, Kaveheimo moved to the extreme right and became a member of the Patriotic People's Movement. Later, he was elected chairman of the SKA, founded in July 1935. Kaveheimo was also a candidate of IKL in the 1936 parliamentary elections.
