= Fredrik Vilhelm Lagerstedt =

Finnish farmer and politician (1836–1904)

Fredrik Vilhelm Lagerstedt (8 January 1836 – 8 January 1904) was a Finnish farmer and politician, born in Lapua. He was a member of the Diet of Finland in 1882, 1885, 1888, 1891, 1894, 1897, 1899 and 1900. He was the father of Oskari Lahdensuo and of Jalo Lahdensuo.
