= Hilja Riipinen =

Finnish politician

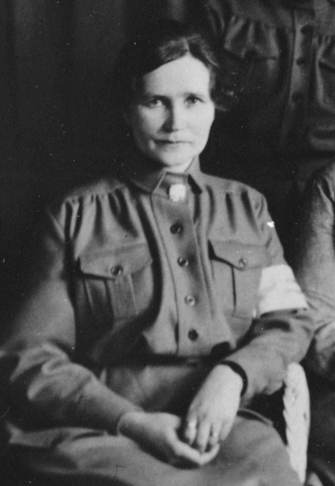

Member of the Finnish Parliament
- In office 21 October 1930 – 31 August 1939

Personal details
- Born: 30 October 1883 Oulujoki, Grand Duchy of Finland, Russian Empire
- Died: 18 January 1966 (aged 82) Helsinki, Finland
- Party: National Coalition Party (1930–1933); Patriotic People's Movement (1933–1939)
- Spouse: Ale Riipinen
- Occupation: Politician, teacher, headmistress

Hilja Elisabet Riipinen (30 June 1883 – 18 January 1966, née Miklin, later Metsäpolku) was a Finnish politician involved with the nationalist and anti-communist Lapua Movement and Patriotic People's Movement (IKL). She was a member of parliament between 1930 and 1939, first elected from the electoral list of the National Coalition Party, but she defected to the Patriotic People's Movement after it was formed as a political party in 1933.

Being uncompromising in her general address, one of the most vehemently anti-communist IKL parliamentarians and her support for radical elements in the movement proved troublesome for her relations outside of the party. This earned her the nickname Hurja-Hilja, or "Wild Hilja".

== Early life and education ==
Hilja Miklin was born to a family of eight children in Oulujoki in 1883. The family was a part of the Awakening (Herännäisyys) Lutheran religious movement. Found to be gifted, Hilja was granted a place in the all-girls school in Oulu. She completed student matriculation in 1902. She started studies in languages, literature and aesthetics at the University of Helsinki, financed with a bank loan. Initially she wanted to teach the German language, but due to its poor employment prospects in comparison with the Russian language, she switched to Russian. Hilja was employed in a co-educational school in Lapua in 1906, and she graduated with a master's degree later in 1910. She met her future husband, Ale Riipinen, at the school. Eventually her husband moved to Jyväskylä to head another school there in 1929, while Hilja stayed in Lapua as the head teacher of the co-educational.

== Lotta Svärd women's auxiliary work ==
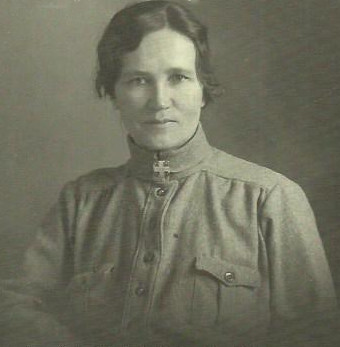
Hilja Riipinen in a Lotta Svärd uniform.

Riipinen was chosen to be the head of the local women's auxiliary Lotta Svärd chapter in 1920. She was elected to the Lotta Svärd central board of directors in 1923 and quickly became a central figure and a well-liked speaker in the organisation. However, she declined inquiries to become the chairperson for the national level. She also became the editor for the Lotta Svärd newspaper. Riipinen later became known as a person who often had dissenting opinions about decisions made in the board of directors. In particular, she criticized leader Fanni Luukkonen for not participating in IKL meetings but participating in women's day events where left-wing people were invited as well. Riipinen was not chosen to the board of directors again and was also dismissed from her position as the editor of the Lotta Svärd newspaper in 1936. Her ties with the organisation were only restored during the wartime.

== Politics ==
=== Women's rights and temperance advocate ===
Riipinen was a strict proponent of equal rights for women. She was influenced by the early Finnish female parliamentarian Hilda Käkikoski, from whom she also adopted pacifist ideas. In her earlier speeches, there was a sense of confrontation between the sexes, but this view yielded in favour of co-operation with men. Riipinen believed that women should be liberated for a public awakening and activation through education. She supported the ordination of women for priesthood in the church.

Riipinen was also involved with the temperance movement. She supported the law on prohibition and stricter penalties for violating it. She was a board member on a women's national temperance organisation between 1921 and 1931.

=== Anti-communism ===
Hilja Riipinen's anti-communism was sparked by the Finnish Civil War. It turned into relentless hostility against socialism and she kept reminding of the "bloody Marxist revolution enthusiasm in 1918" in her speeches for years. Her views have been described as one having to take part in a conflict between Marxist and non-Marxist world views, of which only one can win. She also felt that this was a flaw in the political system: democracy could only lead to bad compromises. Being fond of "high spirituality", she opposed Marxist materialism and will to dispose traditional morality and modesty. Riipinen thought that socialism poisoned people's relationship to work by claiming that work is slavery. Her radical views were widely noted in left-wing circles who considered her one of the worst agitators. Socialist newspapers wrote about "Amazon Hilja Riipinen" and referred to the "white fists of Hilja Riipinen".

=== Member of parliament ===
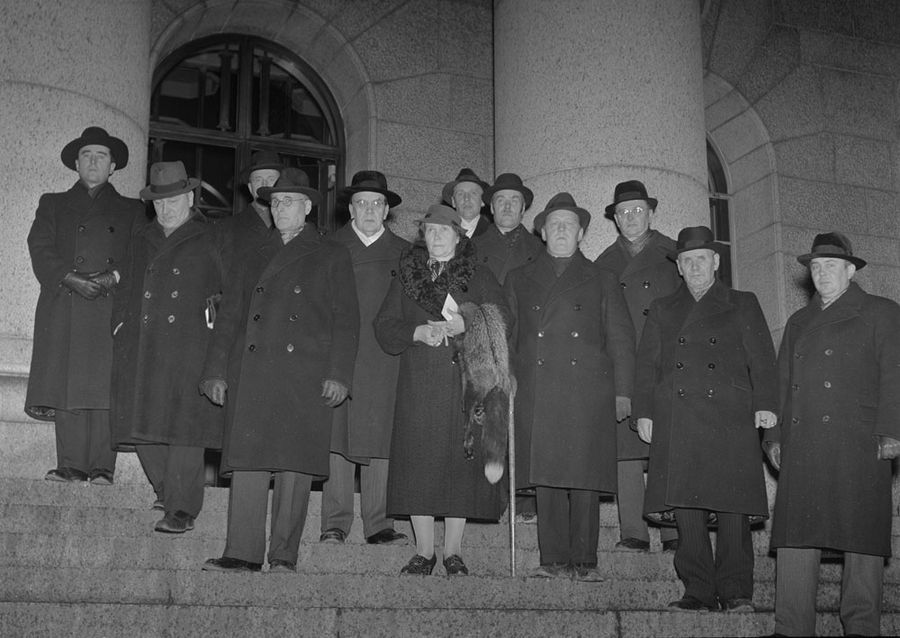
The IKL parliamentary group, Riipinen in the middle

Riipinen was elected to the Parliament of Finland in the 1930 parliamentary election from the National Coalition Party electoral list. Her relations within the party became strained as she was straightforward and did not prefer to compromise. She was one of the few in her parliamentary group who supported the shift towards radicalisation in the Lapua Movement. For this reason, Lapua supporters said: "There is only one man in the parliament, and that one happens to be a woman".

When the Patriotic People's Movement was formed as a political party in 1933, Hilja Riipinen defected to their parliamentary group and was the only woman among the 14 MPs, and later likewise the only woman in IKL's parliamentary record. Riipinen was among the most radical in the IKL parliamentary group, receiving a warning for impetuosity from the party. She was supportive of the fascist regimes of Italy and Germany in her speeches, a line which was not mainstream in the IKL. She also conflicted with the IKL leadership when she led the women's section for the party, with male IKL leadership seizing a board meeting to prevent what they saw as harmful decisions.

In 1934, Riipinen was suspended from the parliament for a week for insulting the speaker of the parliament. She became a well-known figure and was mockingly called the "enfant terrible of the parliament". Social democrat Karl-August Fagerholm said of her: "Riipinen was the most fanatical politician I ever met. And since that political person is a woman, there are no limits or borders to that fanaticism". Such was her fanaticism that in 1937 she publicly repudiated Finland's Independence Day, refusing to participate in the national celebrations as she believed it had become too "socialist". She was motivated in this belief by the fact that the Social Democrats had become junior partners in a coalition government, although the pronouncement alienated the far-right further and they came under attack in the liberal press for their nationalist posturing whilst refusing to celebrate Independence Day. In another instance in 1934 Riipinen sponsored a petitionary motion in parliament to bring in a law calling for the compulsory castration of men convicted of child molestation. Riipinen managed to gain the support of party colleagues Bruno Salmiala and Eino Tuomivaara for this motion.

Personally, Hilja Riipinen was not satisfied with working as a member of parliament and found it to be heavy and fruitless. She even became depressed about being in the parliament. She was not re-elected in 1939 and according to her own words returned to do "real work". Overall, Riipinen had made 10 legislative initiatives during her terms, and six of them were related to education.

=== Nazism and fascism ===
Riipinen openly admired Adolf Hitler and Benito Mussolini and never regretted it. As a fluent German speaker Riipinen visited Germany in 1934 and wrote glowingly of her visit to the IKL newspaper Ajan Suunta. Even in 1945 Riipinen supported fighting alongside Germany. After the peace treaty with the USSR, Riipinen was afraid of being arrested and kept a pistol in her work desk. Riipinen supported eugenics and thought "the mentally or physically degenerate are unsuitable to found future families". Riipinen saw the world as a battleground between "Soviet-Jewish-Muscovite globalism" and "patriotic-nationalism". She considered the Jews greedy, rich usurers lacking a fatherland.

== Later life ==
After not being re-elected, she returned to work at the Lapua co-educational school as the head teacher. She retired when she was 70 years old in June 1953. She was granted the honorary title for people with a distinguished career in education, kouluneuvos, by the President of Finland the same year. She continued to write after retirement. Previously she also had translated the works of others, notably Ivan Turgenev's A Sportsman's Sketches. When her second daughter died in 1964, Hilja Riipinen got ill and never recovered. With her condition weakened by Parkinson's disease, she was moved to the Helsinki Deaconess Institute where she died in 1966.

== Bibliography ==
- Nimipäivät. Kaksiosainen näytelmä Lottien ja Suojeluskunnan iltamia varten (1926)
- Junkkarit. Kaksi näytöksinen näytelmä (1927)
- Naisasialiike ja lottatyö (1927)
- Rauhanaate ja rauhantyö (1929)
- Kun se alkoi. Viisiosainen näytelmä vapaussodasta (1944)
