= Jalo Lahdensuo =

Finnish farmer and politician (1882–1973)

Jalo Toivo Lahdensuo (21 October 1882 – 6 October 1973; surname until 1906 Lagerstedt) was a Finnish farmer and politician, born in Lapua. He was a member of the Parliament of Finland from 1921 to 1938, representing the Agrarian League. He served as Minister of Agriculture from 31 May to 22 November 1924, as Minister of Defence from 17 December 1927 to 22 December 1928 and from 21 March 1931 to 14 December 1932 and as Minister of Transport and Public Works from 16 August 1929 to 4 July 1930 and from 7 October 1936 to 12 March 1937. On 17 July 1932, a group of about ten men belonging to the Lapua Movement tried to abduct Minister of Defence Lahdensuo from his home in Lapua. As Lahdensuo had received threats, a group of men, one of whom was Kustaa Tiitu, had gathered to protect him and they managed to repel the attackers. Shots were exchanged and some of the attackers were wounded. The incident led to several Lapua Movement activists being arrested and convicted. Jalo Lahdensuo was the son of Fredrik Vilhelm Lagerstedt and the younger brother of Oskari Lahdensuo. Jalo Lahdensuo's niece was married to Vihtori Kosola, who was the leader of the Lapua Movement.
