= Oskari Lahdensuo =

Finnish politician

Juho Oskari Lahdensuo (22 June 1864 – 3 July 1935; surname until 1906 Lagerstedt) was a Finnish farmer and politician. He was born in Lapua. He was a Member of the Diet of Finland from 1904 to 1905. Lahdensuo was a Member of the Parliament of Finland from 1910 to 1919, representing the Agrarian League. He was the son of Fredrik Vilhelm Lagerstedt and the elder brother of Jalo Lahdensuo.
