= Martti Pihkala =

Finnish politician (1882–1966)

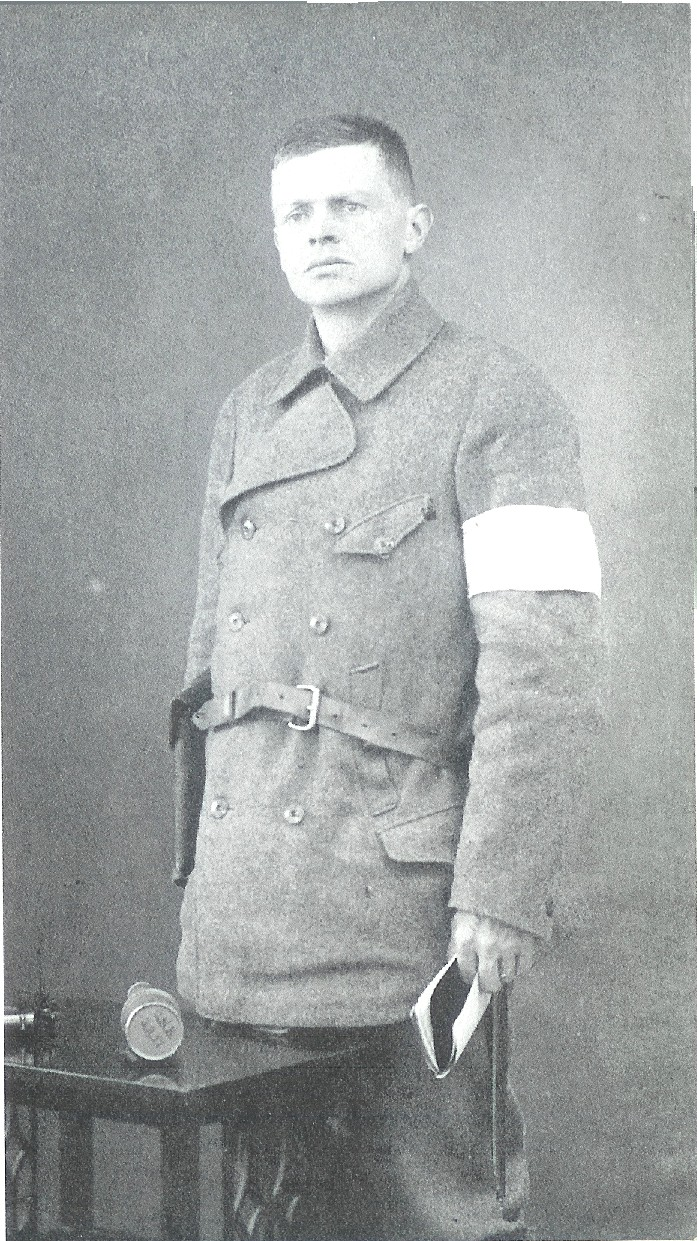

Member of the Parliament of Finland
- In office 21 October 1930 – 31 August 1933

Personal details
- Born: 18 January 1882 Pihtipudas, Vaasa Province Grand Duchy of Finland
- Died: 10 June 1966 (aged 84) Helsinki, Finland
- Party: National Coalition Party (–1933); Patriotic People's Movement (1933–)

Martti Aleksander Pihkala (until 1906 Gummerus, 18 January 1882 – 10 June 1966) was a National Coalition Party MP who became known as a Jäger activist, Ostrobothnia White Guard founder, in the 1920s and 1930s, leader of the strikebreaking organisation Vientirauha, also known as "Pihkala's Guard" and an influencer of the Lapua movement and the Patriotic People's Movement.

== Life ==
Martti Pihkala was born into the Gummerus family, known as the clergy family. His parents were provost Aleksanteri Gummerus and Alma Maria Nordlund. Martti Pihkala's brothers were Bishop Jaakko Gummerus of Tampere and Professors Lauri "Tahko" Pihkala and Rurik Pihkala. Pihkala's son was Professor of Agricultural Sciences KU Pihkala. He is also the grandfather of Bishop Juha Pihkala. The founder of the Gummerus publishing house, Kaarle Jaakko Gummerus, was the uncle of Martti Pihkala. After graduating from high school, Pihkala graduated as a primary school teacher from the Jyväskylä Seminary in 1903. He then worked as a teacher at Jyväskylä's deaf-mute school in 1904–1920.

=== Jäger Movement, the White Guard and the Civil War ===
"These human species who have sunk lower than animals have to be removed from among those who have the right to propagate their bloodline, and their removal has to be done mercilessly."

— Martti Pihkala

Pihkala was involved in Jäger recruitment. In 1917, he toured with his brother Lauri Pihkala in Central Finland and Southern Ostrobothnia to talk about the importance of establishing white guards. Together with Sakari Kuusi, he was the most significant influence on the establishment of the white guards of Central Finland. Pihkala took part in the Finnish Civil War on the White side in the 1st Battalion of the Northern Häme Regiment, led by the Estonian Hans Kalm, which later became known for its violence and war crimes. He was in the White guard headquarters organizing detachments which played a key role in the white terror that took place during the Civil War. It has been suggested that Pihkala also participated in the executions in the prison camps.

In April 1918, Pihkala published the book "What kind of Finland should we create?" In his book, he considered the supreme enemy of culture to be hedonism rather than the goal of the continuation of the family. He advocated forced sterilization and the isolation of those who had "wicked" lives from society as a means of breeding a superior Finnish race. Pihkala placed harmony between social classes as a counterbalance to moral decay and socialism.

=== Strikebreaking organisation Vientirauha ===
After the Civil War, increased leftist activity was particularly evident on construction sites. The number of strikes increased and several of them became politicized. The interests of the Communists and the Soviet Union were seen as the reason for the strikes. In 1920, employers' organizations decided to set up a special organization focused on breaking strikes. Martti Pihkala came to lead this organization called Vientirauha. Vientirauha, known as the 'Pihkala Guard', had a maximum of 34,000 men, from which strike breakers could be assembled if necessary. Especially in Southern Ostrobothnia, Pihkala's organization was strong. Vihtori Kosola, the future frontman of the Lapua movement was an agent for the Vientirauha. The best known of the strikes broken by the organization was the year-long harbor strike that began in 1928.

In Vientirauha, Pihkala offered an opportunity for "white leaders ... who took part in an activist movement or in the preparations for the struggle for freedom ... the most active voluntary way to fight Bolshevism." Vientirauha was a significant successor to the so-called white Finnish ideology and the way to maintain the activist network. Breaking the strikes also led to bloody clashes. Vientirauha came to an end in 1940 with the January negotiations between employers' and workers' organizations during the Winter War called the Betrothal of January.

=== Lapua Movement and the path to membership of parliament ===
The Lapua movement, which sought to completely ban communism and socialism, was born in part as a continuation of the work of the strike breaker organization. One of the key demands of the Lapua movement from the beginning was to secure peace at work for "patriotic workers". The nationwide network for Vientirauha played a key role in organizing the meetings leading to the birth of the Lapua movement. Pihkala was one of the key influencers of the Lapua movement and negotiated with Prime Minister Kyösti Kallio and President Lauri Kristian Relander in the role of liaison. His role in the negotiations and events leading to the formation of the Svinhufvud government was central. Before the most heated phase of the Lapua movement in June 1930, Pihkala asked about the willingness of Prime Minister Kyösti Kallio to become the leader of the Lapua movement and, in practice, the dictator of Finland. Pihkala was elected a National Coalition Party MP in the autumn of 1930 by votes of supporters of the Lapua movement.

=== Patriotic People's Movement ===
After the Lapua Movement ended after the 1932 Mäntsälä Rebellion, Pihkala joined the successor movement Patriotic People's Movement (IKL). Later on Pihkala took a distance to IKL after it approached the working class and created its own union according to the ideology of Volksgemeinschaft.

=== Svinhufvud Testament ===
Pihkala's last attempt to influence Finnish politics took place in the autumn of 1944, when, without the permission of the authorities, he distributed a book he co-authored with former President P. E. Svinhufvud: "Pehr Evind Svinhufvud: A Will to My People". The book called for Finland to remain at war with Germany until the end and condemned all attempts at separate peace. When Finland severed its relations with Germany in September 1944, Pihkala was one of the ten Finns considered to be the most dangerous, and who were detained. The detainees were prominent Finnish National Socialists, fascists and pro-German people. The distribution of the Svinhufvud book was considered to be detrimental to Finland's peace-making. Pihkala was placed under house arrest for three years on a farm he owned in the Helsinki countryside in Rekola. Pihkala spent his last years away from politics, cultivating his farm.

== Sources ==
- Siltala, Juha: Lapuan liike ja kyyditykset 1930. Helsinki: Otava, 1985. ISBN 9511087169. (suomeksi)
- Silvennoinen, Oula & Tikka, Marko & Roselius, Aapo: Suomalaiset fasistit : mustan sarastuksen airuet. Helsinki: WSOY, 2016. ISBN 9789510401323. (suomeksi)
- Uola, Mikko: ”Pihkala, Martti (1882–1966)”, Suomen kansallisbiografia, osa 7: Negri-Pöysti. ISSN 1799-4349 (Verkkojulkaisu). Helsinki: *Suomalaisen Kirjallisuuden Seura, 2006. ISBN 951-746-448-7. Artikkelin maksullinen verkkoversio (suomeksi)
- Vasara, Erkki: Valkoisen Suomen urheilevat soturit Klik!-arkisto. 23.10.1997. Helsinki: Helsingin Sanomat.
- Martti Pihkala. (Suomen kansanedustajat.) Eduskunta.
