= Teemu Mäki =

Finnish artist, theatre director and writer

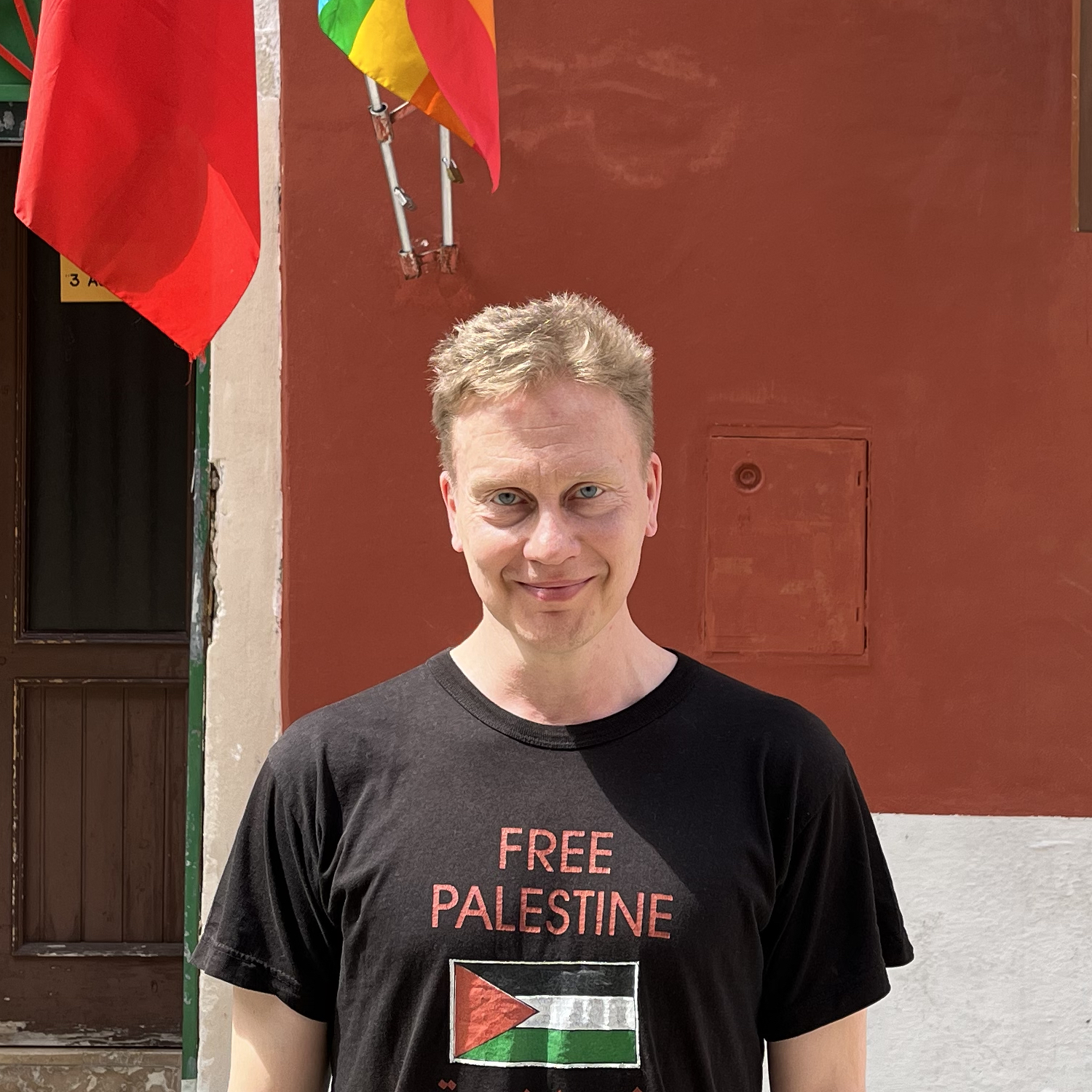
Teemu Mäki in Venice 2022.

Teemu Tuomas Mäki (born 14 October 1967) is a Finnish artist, theatre director and writer. He was born in Lapua, and was one of the first Finnish artists to gain a doctorate (Finnish Art Academy 2005). In 2008–2013 he was the Professor of Fine Arts in Aalto University. Before and after that he has worked as a freelancer.

As a visual artist Mäki started out as painter, then expanded his practice to include photography, installation, performance and videos. Since his doctorate (Academy of Fine Arts, Finland, 2005) Mäki has shared his time equally between visual arts, literature, performing arts (theatre/dance/opera) and artistic research.

In recent years Mäki has concentrated on writing books and directing theatre pieces or films or pieces for radio. His most recent books are Miten olla mies tai nainen tai jotain muuta? (2021), a book of photos & texts, Poika ja pallo (2020), his fourth collection of poems, and Taiteen tehtävä (2017), a collection of essays on art and on art's philosophical and political potential and function in society. The latter book is a sequel to the written/theoretical part of his doctoral dissertation, Näkyvä pimeys – esseitä taiteesta, filosofiasta ja politiikasta / Darkness Visible – Essays on Art, Philosophy and Politics (2005/2007).

Mäki sees himself as a moral relativist, atheist, vitalist and socialist. There seem to be certain pet themes that he keeps on returning to both in his artworks and also in his non-artistic writings and public speeches. Critique of consumer capitalism is certainly of them. Defending extreme freedom of speech is another. Demanding quick reduction of consumption of goods and natural resources in order to stop ecological catastrophe is third. Gender politics is maybe the fourth, as can be seen for example in the photo series How to Be a Woman or Man? and its accompanying text, in which Mäki writes that:

"That gender roles are products of culture is potentially both an oppressive and emancipatory fact. The oppressing side is that as gender roles are created and defined in by social and political forces, they can be – and usually are – as unequal, as unfair as any other structure in society. A stereotypical gender role in this sense is almost automatically a prison, that restricts a person's personality and/or enables him/her to restrict other peoples personalities. The benign and emancipatory side of the same thing is that a person is not at the mercy of his/her biological or cultural gender, one is not 'born to become a man (or a woman)', but can instead understand that his/her gender identity was and continually is formed by culture and s/he can and should take the steering wheel in this process – to be an active subject, not a printout of cultural prejudice."

A more complex and perhaps the most important theme (to him) seems to be mortality. Mäki claims that all meaning and passion that human beings can attain is derived from and made possible by death. All of these themes are easy to detect both in Mäki's visual artworks, theatre works, poetry and also in his doctoral dissertation and in his non-artistic, regular column that he writes for the Finnish magazine Voima. The 'mortality as the source of life and passion' theme returns again in Mäki's "Art and Research Colliding"-text, which was published in May 2014, on the internet, by the Journal for Artistic Research.

Mäki's artworks, writings and newspaper columns have provoked heated public debates. He has for example campaigned against criminalization of prostitution and claimed that as long as sex work is voluntary it's not worse than many other jobs in capitalist labor market. He also claimed that the only way to guarantee that sex work is voluntary enough is by providing a good enough social security for all – instead of trying to criminalize and ban sex work.

After his doctorate Mäki became active in the field of artistic research. In addition to his own research he tutors doctoral students, was first a member of the board of TAhTO (Doctoral Programme in Artistic Research) and then a member of the program's steering group (2012–2015). For some years he was also a member of the editorial team of RUUKKU (Studies in Artistic Research)].

Since 2018 Mäki is the chairperson of The Artists' Association of Finland and since 2022 the president of IAA Europe.

Mäki has received numerous grants from the state of Finland and from various foundations. He has also received a few prizes. In 1997 he was awarded the Palokärki Prize by the Artists' Association of Finland. In 2021 his photographic book Miten olla mies tai nainen tai jotain muuta? (How to Be a Man or a Woman or Something Else?) was awarded the Photographic Art Book of the Year prize by the Finnish Museum of Photography and The Association of Photographic Artists of Finland.

== Books by Teemu Mäki ==
- Miten olla mies tai nainen tai jotain muuta?. A book of photography with a text. Helsinki: Parvs, 2021. ISBN 978-952-7226-67-4. https://parvs.fi/kirjat/teemu-maki/
- Poika ja pallo. A collection of poems. Helsinki: Gummerus, 2020. ISBN 978-951-241-700-1.
- Taiteen tehtävä. Essays. Helsinki: Into, 2017. ISBN 978-952-264-835-8.
- Äidin oma. A collection of poems. Helsinki: Like, 2016. ISBN 978-952-01-1413-8.
- Maalarin silmin (pakko ei oo ku kualla), a book about painting. Helsinki: Into-kustannus & Lapua Art Museum 2014. ISBN 978-952-67716-7-0 (PDF). ISBN 978-952-67716-8-7 (EPUB).
- Rääkypönttö, a collection of poems. Helsinki: WSOY 2010. ISBN 978-951-0-36752-0.
- Kuolevainen, a collection of poems. Helsinki: WSOY 2008. ISBN 978-951-0-34537-5. Estonian translation, by Taavi Eelmaa: Surelik, ZA/UM 2015. ISBN 9789949338443.
- Darkness Visible – Essays on Art, Philosophy and Politics, (doctoral dissertation). Helsinki: Kuvataideakatemia / Finnish Art Academy 2007. ISBN 978-951-53-2975-2.
- Näkyvä pimeys – esseitä taiteesta, filosofiasta ja politiikasta, (väitöskirja). Helsinki: Kuvataideakatemia & Like-kustannus 2005. ISBN 952-471-417-5.
- Teemu Mäki, Helsinki: Like-kustannus 2002. ISBN 951-578-943-5.

== Selected Articles by Teemu Mäki ==
- Mäki, Teemu: Art and Research Colliding, published in JAR (Journal for Artistic Research), in May 2014.
- Mäki, Teemu: A Practical Utopia, published in RUUKKU (Studies in Artistic Research), in October 2014.

== Selected Theatre / Opera Works ==
- Posthuman / Ihmisen jälkeen. Opera composed by Max Savikangas, written and directed by Teemu Mäki. Premiere at Dance House Helsinki, 3.3.2023.
- Bliss / Autuus. Opera composed by Antti Auvinen, libretto by Harry Salmenniemi, directed by Teemu Mäki. Premiere at Music House Helsinki, 16.8.2015, restaging at Finnish National Opera in 2021.
- ÉLIANE. Directed by Teemu Mäki & Maija Nurmio. Premiere at Vaba Lava Theater, Tallinn, Estonia, 14.1.2020.
- Homo Secundus — Marx's Revenge. Written by Miko Kivinen & Teemu Mäki. Directed by Teemu Mäki. Produced by Theatre Telakka, Dance Theatre Minimi and Tsuumi Dance Theatre. Premiere at Theatre Telakka, Tampere, Finland, 27.9.2019.
- The Gospel of Christmas / Jouluevankeliumi. Written & directed by Teemu Mäki. Premiere at Kiasma Theatre, Helsinki, 7.12.2018.
- Sinusta tulee koivu / You'll Be a Tree. Written & directed by Teemu Mäki. Premiere at STOA, Itäkeskus, Helsinki, 15.10.2017.
- The Judge's Wife / Tuomarin vaimo. An opera composed by Riikka Talvitie. Based on a script by Caryl Churchill. Directed by Teemu Mäki. Premiere at Balder's House, Helsinki, 16.3.2017.
- Transformations – Rewriting Masculinity / Otteita maskuliinisuuden sanakirjasta. Teemu Mäki & Transforces. Mad House Helsinki. Premiere 17.3.2016.
- Teoreema (Rakkausnäytelmä). Directed by Niina Hosiasluoma & Teemu Mäki. Teatteri Takomo, Helsinki. Premiere 28.3.2014.
- Woyzeckmaterial. Script by Teemu Mäki. Directed by Teemu Mäki & Arja Tiili, Viirus teater 2012, Helsinki.
- All Matters – No Escape / Kaikki Vaikuttaa (2. version). Directed by Teemu Mäki & Arja Tiili. Cultural Center Gloria & Malmitalo & Kanneltalo & STOA, Helsinki, 2011.
- Helsinki by Skoda. by Niina Hosiasluoma & Teemu Mäki & Pilvi Porkola. A Reality Research Center production. Premiere 9.8.2011.
- Harmoonia / Harmonia / Harmony. Script by Teemu Mäki (& Juha-Pekka Hotinen). Directed by Teemu Mäki. Von Krahl Theatre, Tallinn. Premiere 29.1.2008.
- Badminton Opera / Sulkapallo-ooppera. Composed by Max Savikangas. Libretto by Juha-Pekka Hotinen & Teemu Mäki. Directed by Juha-Pekka Hotinen & Teemu Mäki. Kiasma Theatre, Helsinki, 2005.

== Selected Films (as Writer / Director) ==
Early in his career Mäki made dozens of video art or media art pieces that were shown mainly in art galleries, museums and festivals. Then he started to make long form films, often documentaries, working with bigger budgets cinema production companies. The longer ones, made not so much for the visual art scene, but for cinema and/or television, include:

- RIVERBULLS (A Letter to Vladimir Putin. A 58-minute documentary film written and directed by Teemu Mäki. Produced by Isle Art Industries. Premiere at Seinäjoki Art Hall, 20.1.2023.
- REFUGEE CONVERSATIONS / PAKOLAISKESKUSTELUJA. A 92-minute documentary film written and directed by Teemu Mäki. Television premiere on YLE Teema (Finland) 11.4.2020.
- MADNESS AND CIVILIZATION / HULLUUS JA YHTEISKUNTA. A 56-minute docu-drama directed by Teemu Mäki. Based on a radio play written by Harri Virtanen and directed by Juha-Pekka Hotinen. Commissioned by YLE (Finland). Television premiere on YLE Teema (Finland) 2014.

== Controversies ==
As a student at the Academy of Fine Arts in Helsinki, in 1988 Teemu Mäki became notorious in Finland for a video art work titled Sex and Death, which includes a segment in which he utterly grotesque way killed a cat and masturbated over the cat's dead body.

In 1991 Mäki was convicted of fraud and animal cruelty due to his giving an affidavit to a local animal rescue center, that he would treat the animal well and would not kill it without the rescue centre's permission. The court of appeal concluded, that the cat did not die quickly enough due to the poor quality of the axe used. The controversy was renewed in 2004, when the modern art museum Kiasma bought the video for its collection. After the second uproar in 2004 Mäki wrote an essay about the subject.
