= Nina Sailo =

Finnish sculptor (1906–1998)

- Born: 26 July 1906
- Died: 15 November 1998 (aged 92)

Nina Sailo (née Stünkel; 26 July 1906 – 15 November 1998) was a sculptor from Finland.

Nina Stünkel studied in Vyborg, Helsinki and London. In 1932 she became a private student of sculptor Alpo Sailo, whom she later married. They traveled together in Karelia, looking for oral poets and portraiting them.

Sailo's art is on permanent public display in parks and cemeteries in Tornio, Helsinki and Lappeenranta. Famous statues include a realistic bronze memorial of Tahko Pihkala and life-size statue commemorating Lotta Svärd, the Finnish voluntary auxiliary paramilitary organisation for women.
