= Rauno Kallia =

Finnish jurist and politician (1901–1948)

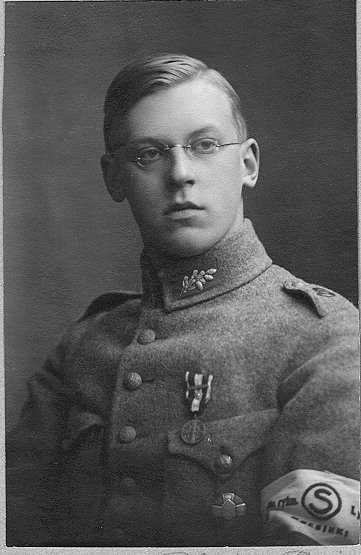
Rauno Kallia in 1918

Rauno Gustaf Ilmari (R. G.) Kallia (28 June 1901 – 10 October 1948) was a Finnish jurist and politician, born in Helsinki. He was a member of the Parliament of Finland from 1939 to 1945, representing the Patriotic People's Movement (IKL) until September 1944 and as an Independent after that, as the IKL was disbanded as a result of the Moscow Armistice of 19 September 1944. He was a presidential elector in the 1937, 1940 and 1943 presidential elections.
