= Bruno Salmiala =

Finnish legal theorist and far-right politician (1890–1981)

Bruno Aleksander Salmiala
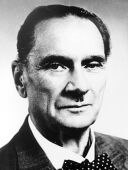
- Salmiala c. 1940
- Born: Bruno Sundström; August 24, 1890; Gävle, Sweden
- Died: September 4, 1981 (aged 91); Helsinki
- Citizenship: Finnish
- Education: PhD
- Alma mater: University of Helsinki
- Occupation: Professor of criminal law
- Employer: University of Helsinki
- Known for: Legal theorist, Politician
- Title: Deputy leader of IKL
- Political party: Patriotic People's Movement
- Spouse(s): Lydia Theresia Schütz (1917–1942, divorce); Jenny Edla Somppi (1943–)
- Parent(s): Alexander Konstantin Sundström; Emilia Lindén

Bruno Aleksander Salmiala (24 August 1890 in Gävle, Sweden as Bruno Sundström – 4 September 1981 in Helsinki) was a Finnish legal theorist and a far-right politician.

== Legal career ==
Salmiala completed his PhD in jurisprudence at the University of Helsinki in 1924 and became a career academic, serving as a professor of criminal law at the institution from 1925 to 1959. He worked as the secretary of the Finnish Bar Association from 1920 to 1957 and was the executive editor of the legal journal Defensor Legis for 48 years (1920–1968). Salmiala also had an extensive career in the civil service, first as the deputy Parliamentary Ombudsman (1924–1928), then as a prosecutor (1926–1930) and finally as the head of the Criminal law institute (1955–1959).

== Politics ==
Salmiala's first involvement in politics came in 1928 when he was appointed to the board of directors of Uusi Suomi, the organ of the conservative National Coalition Party. However his opinions shifted to the right and in 1932 he joined the Academic Karelia Society and became a founder member of the Patriotic People's Movement (IKL). He was appointed deputy leader in charge of organisation in the latter movement. An opponent of the violent tactics sometimes employed by the IKL due to his legal background he was nonetheless ideologically radical in contrast to the more conservative likes of Herman Gummerus and Erkki Räikkönen. He also represented Häme Province in the Parliament of Finland for the IKL from 1933 to 1944. Additionally, Salmiala served as an elected member of the Helsinki city council.

== Later years ==
Salmiala dropped out of politics after the Second World War and, as well as continuing his academic work, was a member of the Finnish Radio and Television Committee. He lived to the age 91.
