= Vientirauha =

Finnish strikebreaking paramilitary

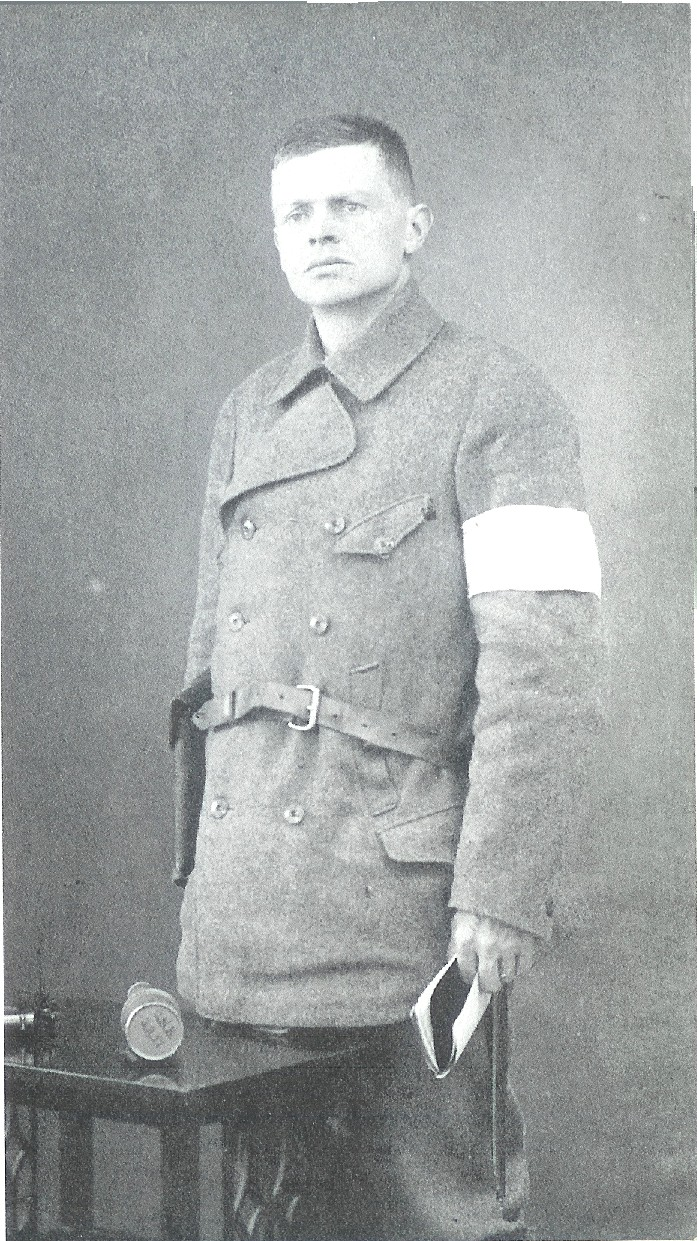
Martti Pihkala, a member of the Vientirauha

Vientirauha (Finnish for "export peace") was a Finnish paramilitary strikebreaking organization. Established in 1920, it peaked at 34,000 members, and was led by Martti Pihkala.

== History ==
In the early 1920s, Finnish communists and social democrats fought for control of Finnish Trade Union Federation and trade unions. However, employers did not recognize trade unions as negotiating partners and founded Vientirauha in 1920 to break the strikes. The key people in the establishment were Einar Ahlman, Director of Kymin Oy, and Gösta Serlachius, Director of GA Serlachius Oy. Counselor Serlachius had gone on a study trip to the United States and got the idea to form a strike organization. The establishment was prepared by the CEO and General Rudolf Waldén, CEO Jacob von Julin, Gösta Serlachius and CEO Carl Rosenlew. The inaugural meeting was held on February 28, 1920 where the "National Flying Work Corps" was formed. The name was soon changed to the Group Vientirauha. The operation started quickly and without rules; however, care was taken to ensure that all hired workers were opposed to the strike.

Vientirauha was led by activist and Jäger recruiter Martti Pihkala, after whom the organization was also called the Pihkala Guard. Initially, Vientirauha was funded by the paper industry, but during the 1920s all major employers' unions joined. Breaking the strike was possible in those areas where no special skills were required at work. A parallel organization, Teknisen Työn Turva (“technical work security”), was set up to break down strikes in areas requiring special expertise, but this organization remained short-lived.

Strike breakers were recruited either through the White Guard or through a network of recruiters. The strike-breakers were often boys of farmhouses or wealthier cottagers, and Southern Ostrobothnia was a key recruitment area. There were several members of the Jäger movement and those on the white side of the Finnish Civil War. One of the organisation's best-known agents was Vihtori Kosola in Southern Ostrobothnia.

The employees of Vientirauha considered the activities of the strikers to be Soviet-backed construction site terror, while the strikers considered the employees of Vientirauha to be trampling on their means of survival. The strikes of the 1920s were often very long, for example, the nationwide port strike of 1928–1929 lasted ten months, and employers tried to break these strikes with the help of Vientirauha. The operation of the Vientirauha came to an end in 1940 with the so called Betrothal of January between employers and workers' organizations during the Winter War.

== See also ==
- Pinkerton (detective agency)
