= Ale Riipinen =

Finnish artistic gymnast

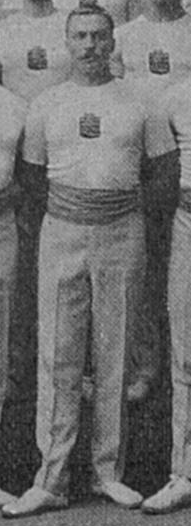
- Riipinen in 1908

Personal information
- Full name: Heikki Aleksi Riipinen
- Born: 28 May 1883 Laukaa, Grand Duchy of Finland, Russian Empire
- Died: 13 February 1957 (aged 73) Leppävaara, Finland
- Spouse: Hilja Riipinen (m. 1911)

Gymnastics career
- Discipline: Men's artistic gymnastics
- Country represented: Finland
- Club: Ylioppilasvoimistelijat
Medal record
Men's artistic gymnastics
Representing Finland
Olympic Games
Bronze medal – third place	1908 London	Team

Heikki Aleksi "Ale" Riipinen (28 May 1883 – 13 February 1957) was a Finnish gymnast who won bronze in the 1908 Summer Olympics.

== Early life and education ==
Riipinen was born on 28 May 1883 in Laukaa, Grand Duchy of Finland, Russian Empire, to farmer Mikko Riipinen and Iida Manninen. He completed his matriculation exam at the Jyväskylä Classical Lyceum in 1903 and graduated as a physical education teacher in 1908.

== Gymnastics career ==
Ale Riipinen at the Olympic Games
Games	Event	Rank	Notes
1908 Summer Olympics	Men's team	3rd	Source:

He won the Finnish national championship in team gymnastics as a member of Ylioppilasvoimistelijat in 1909.

== Post-gymnastics career ==
Riipinen worked as a school teacher in Lapua from 1908–1927, also becoming a rector. Then, he worked as a lecturer in Jyväskylä from 1927 to 1948. Finally, he returned to Lapua to teach until 1951. He was the chairman of the state taxation board in Lapua in 1923–1927.

He also wrote on physical education and other subjects in Suomen Urheilulehti and other papers.

Riipinen served in the White Guard as a platoon leader and a company commander during the Finnish Civil War. He was a garrison commandant in the Finnish Defence Forces and a chief of office of a White Guard district during the Second World War. He reached the rank of lieutenant.

He played a small part in initiating the namesake action of the Lapua Movement, although it is unknown if he actually participated in it.

== Awards and honors ==
He received the following honorary awards:

- Cross of Liberty, 4th Class
- The cross of merit of the Civil Guards
- Medals of the Finnish Civil War:
  - The commemorative medal of the capture of Tampere
  - The Vilppula cross
- Decorations of the heimosodat:
  - The commemorative medal of Carelia

He is also an honorary member of several clubs and associations.

== Personal life ==
Riipinen married Hilja Riipinen in 1911. They had two children:

1. Heljä Kaarina, born 1912, died 1926
2. Anna Pirkko Sätene, born 1920, died 1964

He died from a heart attack in Espoo while visiting his daughter.
