= Erkki Räikkönen =

Finnish nationalist leader

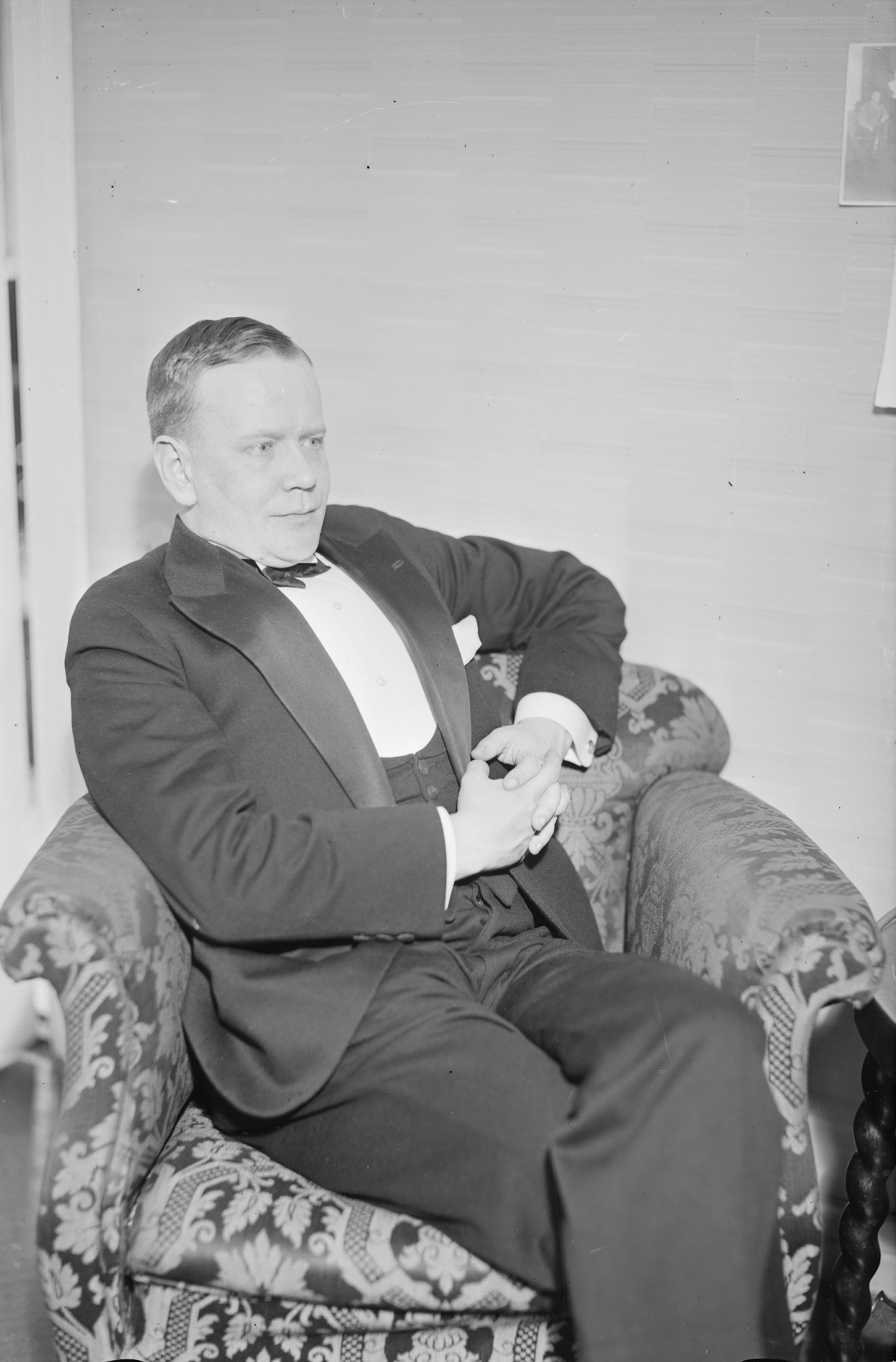
- Born: Erkki Aleksanteri Räikkönen; 13 August 1900; Saint Petersburg
- Died: 30 March 1961 (aged 60); Sweden
- Citizenship: Finnish
- Education: University of Helsinki
- Notable work: Kustaa Vaasa
- Political party: Patriotic People's Movement

Erkki Aleksanteri Räikkönen (13 August 1900 – 30 March 1961) was a Finnish nationalist leader.

Born in St. Petersburg to a cantor, he attended the University of Helsinki before taking part in the ill-fated mission to secure independence for Karelia in 1921. Like most of those who took part in this event he joined the Academic Karelia Society (AKS), helping to found the movement along with Elias Simojoki and Reino Vähäkallio. He quit in 1928 to join Itsenäisyyden Liitto (Independence League), a group that had been formed by Pehr Evind Svinhufvud, Räikkönen's most admired political figure. Räikkönen took this decision in response to the banning of the Lapua Movement, a move that had left the far right in Finland without a wide organisational basis (groups like AKS having small, elite memberships).

Along with Herman Gummerus and Vilho Annala Räikkönen was the founder of the Patriotic People's Movement in 1932. He would not stay a member long however as the group soon became purely Finnish (isolating the Swedish-speaking Räikkönen) and he moved closer to Nazism.

Having left the movement he contented himself with editing the journal Suomen Vapaussota, whilst also becoming involved in Gustav Vasa movement, a Nazi organization for Finland's Swedish-speaking population and Blue Cross, another Nazi group. He ultimately emigrated to Sweden in 1945 and lived out his life there in retirement.
