= Leo Gummerus =

Finnish politician

Leo Benedikt Gummerus (20 June 1885, Kurkijoki - 16 December 1956) was a Finnish Lutheran clergyman and politician. He was a member of the Parliament of Finland from 1927 to 1929, representing the National Coalition Party.
