= Herman Gummerus =

Finnish classical scholar and diplomat

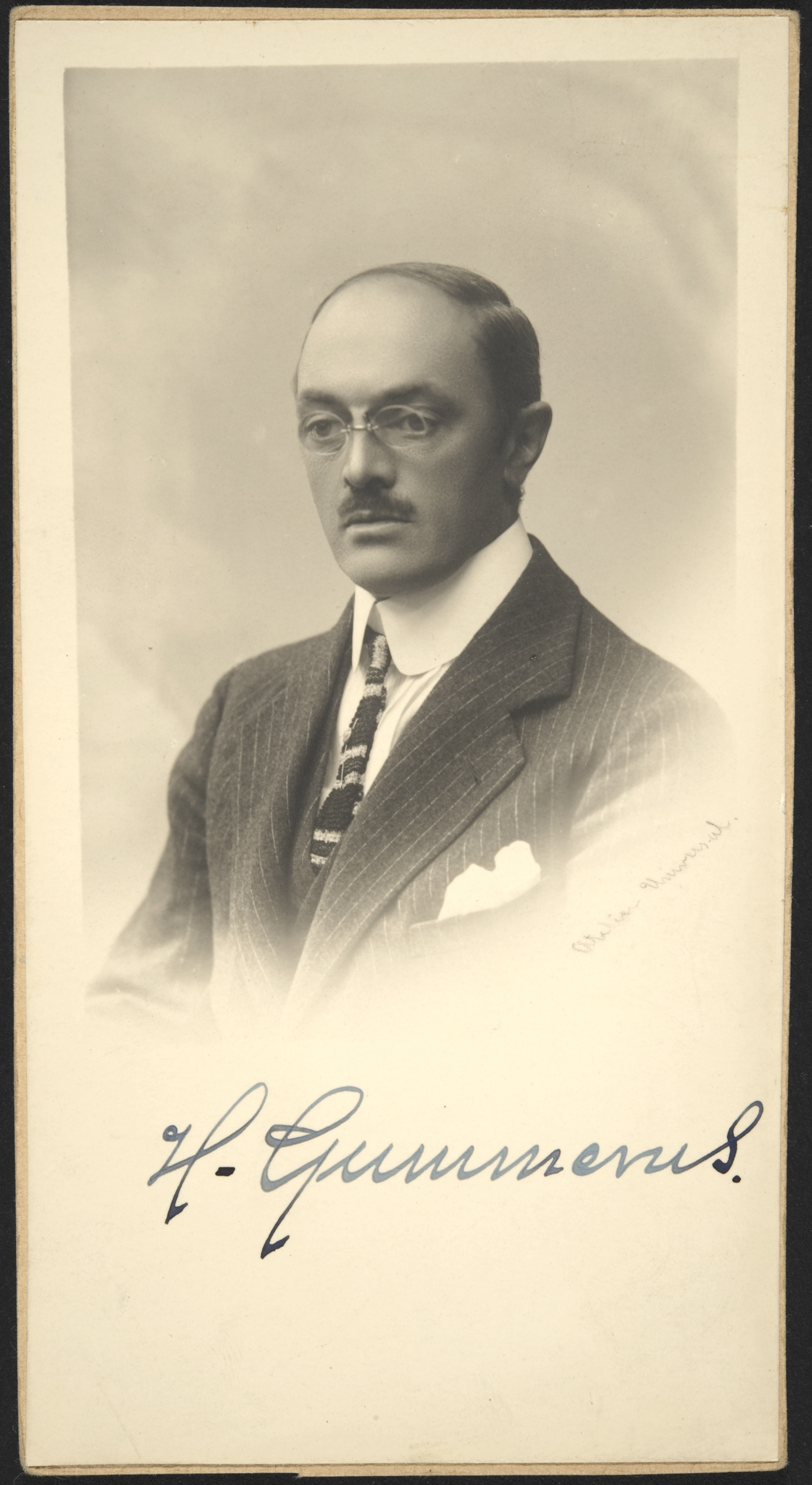
- Herman Gummerus
- Born: Herman Gregorius Gummerus; 24 December 1877; Saint Petersburg, Russian Empire
- Died: 18 July 1948 (aged 70); Helsinki, Finland
- Citizenship: Finnish
- Occupation: Classics lecturer
- Employer: University of Helsinki
- Known for: Politician, diplomat
- Political party: Patriotic People's Movement

Herman Gregorius Gummerus (24 December 1877 – 18 July 1948) was a leading Finnish classical scholar, diplomat, and one of the founders of the Patriotic People's Movement (IKL).

== Early life ==
Born in Saint Petersburg into a Swedish-speaking family to Herman Erik Gummerus and Olga Elisabeth Krook, Gummerus became an expert on the economy and society of Ancient Rome, and lectured at the University of Helsinki from 1911 to 1920 and again from 1926 to 1947. He initially studied in Helsinki, and then specialized in ancient history under the direction of Eduard Meyer in the University of Berlin.

== Career ==
=== Academic ===
His studies on Rome were particularly concerned with rural life in the later period of the empire, a subject upon which he wrote widely. Gummerus' doctoral dissertation Der römische Gutsbetrieb als wirtschaftlicher Organismus nach den Werken des Cato, Varro und Columella (1906) examined large Roman estates using mainly literary sources. A new edition of the dissertation was published in Germany in the 1960s, and key parts were translated into Italian in 1982. He further examined the economic system of the Roman empire in an article (Industrie und Handel, RE IX (1916), coll. 1381–1535) published in the Pauly–Wissowa classical encyclopedia, this time systematically using Archeological artifacts in his study. This article remained the standard work on the subject for half a century. Gummerus' technique predated the work of Michael Rostovtzeff by a decade.

=== Political ===
An early advocate of Finnish independence, Gummerus was suspected of involvement in the assassination of Nikolai Bobrikov and imprisoned in 1904, spending time in Peter and Paul Fortress before being released in October of that year. He went on to edit the journal Framtid and before forming the anti-Russification Wetterhof Bureau (later Finnish Bureau) in Germany in 1915. During the First World War he led the Stockholm delegation working for Finnish liberation and organised the Finnish Jäger Movement in 1915–1918. After independence had been achieved Gummerus was appointed to posts in Stockholm and Kiev, where he had extended his anti-Russian activity and where he helped set up a legation during Ukrainian People's Republic's brief independence. He became Envoy to Rome in 1920 (a post he held until 1925) and developed an admiration for the growing fascist movement whilst in Italy. His wife Alexandrine (San) Hedenberg was initially an asset in his diplomatic career, but her unconventional behaviour came to be seen as a liability. His diplomatic career ended in 1925, most likely due to Finland adopting a more cautious foreign policy following Soviet concerns about British relations with Finland and the border states, rather than for personal reasons.

On his return to Finland, and with the leaders of the Lapua Movement mostly imprisoned, he joined with Erkki Räikkönen, a fellow Swedish-speaker, and Vilho Annala to form IKL as a slightly more moderate continuation. Driven by an inherent conservatism, Gummerus desired an electoral alliance with the National Coalition Party but soon found that the rank and file of IKL had no interest in this. IKL also adopted a strong position on the importance of the Finnish language, following the lead of the Academic Karelia Society and further isolating the Swedish-speaking Gummerus. He finally left the movement in 1934 and took no further role in active politics. Having grown disillusioned with democracy during the 1920s, Gummerus acted as a background figure for right-wing radical movements during the 1930s before retreating to focus on teaching and research.

Despite his linguistic identity Gummerus went on to criticize Sweden, attacking the Blue Book of former Swedish foreign minister Johannes Hellner, which claimed that Sweden had only been interested in cultivating Finland as a good neighbour in the Åland crisis. Gummerus argued that, whilst this may have been the case, Swedish attitudes towards the newly independent country where such that a state of mistrust and suspicion was engendered between the two countries.

== Bibliography ==
=== Academic works ===
- Der römische Gutsbetrieb als wirtschaftlicher Organismus nach den Werken des Cato, Varro und Columella, Leipzig 1906.
- "Die Fronden der Kolonen", Öfversigt af Finska Vetenskaps-Societetens Förhandlingar 50, 1908.
- "De Columella philosopho", Öfversigt af Finska Vetenskaps-Societetens Förhandlingar 52, 1910.
- "Die römische Industrie. Wirtschaftsgeschichtliche Untersuchungen", Klio 14–15, 1914–1918.
- "Industrie und Handel", Realenzyklopädie der Classischen Altertumswissenschaft IX, 1916.
- Die südgallische Terrasigillata-Industrie nach den Graffiti aus La Graufesenque (Commentationes humanarum litterarum 3,3. Finnish Society of Sciences and Letters), Helsinki 1930.
- Der Ärztestand im römischen Reiche nach den Inschriften I (Commentationes humanarum litterarum 3,6. Finnish Society of Sciences and Letters), Helsinki 1932.

=== Memoirs and biographies ===
- Aktiva kampår 1899–1910, Helsinki 1925.
- Jägare och aktivister, Helsinki 1927.
- Finlands prästerskap på 1600- och 1700-talen, Helsinki 1927.
- Orostider i Ukraina (translated into Ukrainian 1997, 2004), Helsinki 1931.
- Pehr Evind Svinhufvud: En biografi, Helsinki 1931.
- Konni Zilliacus. En levnadsteckning, Helsinki 1933.
- P.E. Svinhufvud 1861–1936, Helsinki 1936.
- Pilsudski. Det nya Polens skapare, Stockholm 1936.
- Sverige och Finland 1917–1936, Stockholm 1936.
- Fältmarskalk Mannerheim, Helsinki 1937.
- Deutschland und die Befreiung Finnlands, Greifswald 1938.
