= Vilho Annala =

Finnish politician (1888–1960)

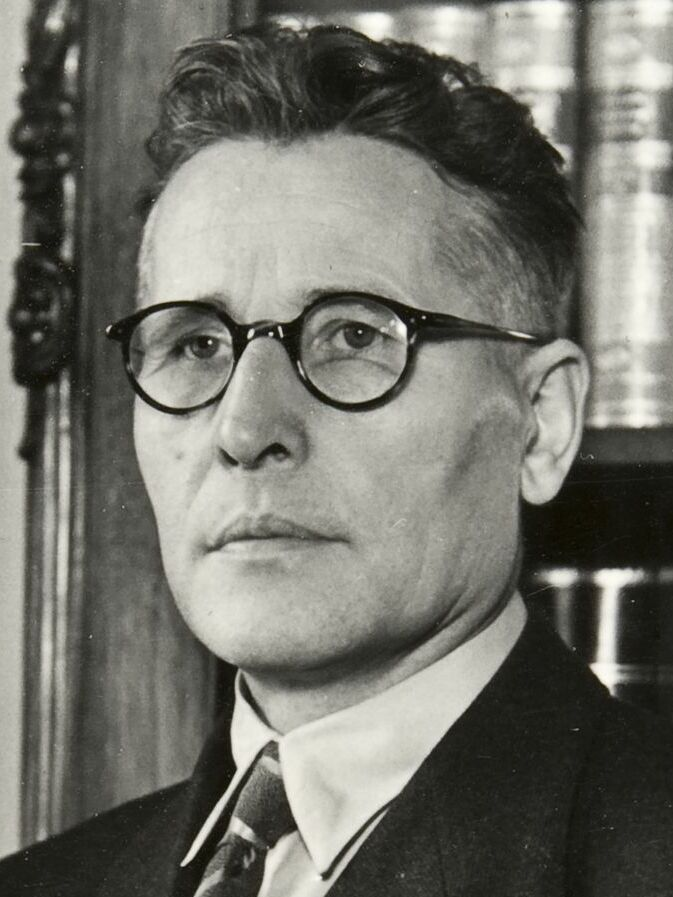

Minister of Transport and Public Works
- In office 4 January 1941 – 5 March 1943
- Prime Minister: Johan Wilhelm Rangell
- Preceded by: Karl-Erik Ekholm
- Succeeded by: Toivo Ikonen

Personal details
- Born: Vilho Annala; 17 January 1888 Lapua, Grand Duchy of Finland
- Died: 28 July 1960 (aged 72) Helsinki, Finland
- Citizenship: Finnish
- Party: Lapua Movement, Patriotic People's Movement
- Spouse: Inez Mirjam Wink
- Education: University of Helsinki
- Profession: Professor

Vilho Annala (17 January 1888 – 28 July 1960) was a Finnish civil servant, economist and far right politician.

== Early years ==
Annala was born in Lapua, and first came to prominence as a student at the University of Helsinki, where he edited the student union newspaper Ylioppilaslehti from 1916 to 1919. He went on to work for the Bureau of Statistics, whilst serving on the editorial staff of the conservative daily Uusi Suomi. He gained a doctorate in 1932 and became one of Finland's leading civil servants.

== Politics ==
Annala joined the Lapua Movement and became Helsinki District Chairman in February 1931. Ideologically Annala was heavily influenced by the corporatism of Italian fascism. He supported the co-opting of the working classes into the Lapua Movement and opposed the influence of wealthy industrialists.

In April 1932 Annala joined Herman Gummerus and Erkki Räikkönen in founding the Patriotic People's Movement (IKL) and he served as caucus chairman from 1936 to 1944. Between 1933 and 1945 he also represented the party in the Parliament of Finland. Whilst the official leader was Vihtori Kosola real control of the movement rested with Annala and his close lieutenant Bruno Salmiala. It was Annala who dictated the policy of the movement although his hard-line views led to condemnation by both the government and the Evangelical Lutheran Church of Finland that damaged the group. Annala held the post of Minister of Transport in the unity government of Johan Wilhelm Rangell from 1941 to 1943. This however was a last throw for the IKL as the group faded soon afterwards and Annala left politics.

== Later years ==
With his political career over Annala became an academic back at the University of Helsinki. He served there as the professor of political economy 1951–57. He died in Helsinki, aged 72.
