= Lauri Pihkala =

Finnish sportsman

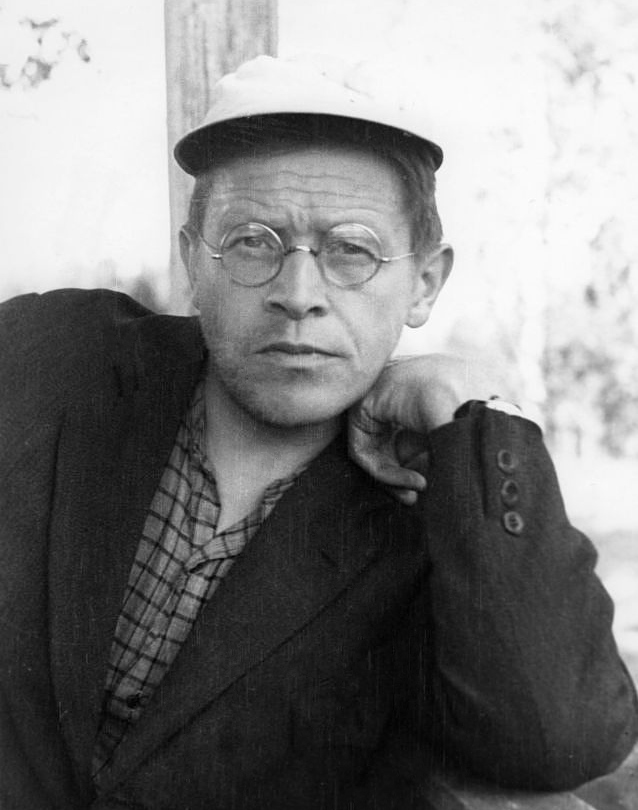

Personal information
- Born: 5 January 1888 Pihtipudas, Grand Duchy of Finland, Russian Empire
- Died: 20 May 1981 (aged 93) Helsinki, Finland
- Height: 179 cm (5 ft 10 in)
- Weight: 79 kg (174 lb)

Sport
- Sport: Athletics
- Events: 800 m, high jump, discus throw
- Club: HKV, Helsinki

Achievements and titles
- Personal bests: 800 m – 1:58.1 (1911); HJ – 1.75 m (1909); DT – 31.40 m (1906)

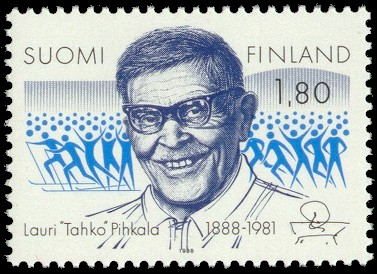
A 1988 postage stamp commemorating the 100th anniversary of the birth of Lauri "Tahko" Pihkala.

Lauri "Tahko" Pihkala (born Gummerus, 5 January 1888 – 20 May 1981) was the inventor of pesäpallo, the Finnish variant of baseball. He was born in the vicarage of Pihtipudas, the son of the minister Alexander Gummerus. In 1969 he became one of the first persons to receive an honorary doctorate in Sport Sciences from the University of Jyväskylä, together with president Urho Kekkonen and Professor Kaarina Kari.

== Athletics ==
Lauri Pihkala at the Olympic Games
Games	Event	Rank	Results	Notes
1908 Summer Olympics	High jump	16th	5 feet 6 inches (168 cm)	Height was measured in inches. Source:
1908 Summer Olympics	Discus throw	12th–42nd	unknown	Source:
1908 Summer Olympics	Shot put	Did not start		Source:
1912 Summer Olympics	800 metres, heats	Did not finish		

In the 1910s, he became the first Finnish professional coach in athletics and also worked as a physical education instructor with the Finnish Army.

Pihkala was known for being an avid sports fan, and he developed several outdoor games.

== Other ==
During the Finnish Civil War, he was responsible for propaganda in the White Guard flying unit "Devils of Kuhmoinen" of major Hans Kalm.

Pihkala's brother Martti Pihkala was a right-wing political activist. Lauri Pihkala did not write any political texts in his publications. He tried to integrate the Finnish working class into society and hoped that sports could be one tool there.

Some writers have claimed that Pihkala took part in the massacre in Harmoinen village in March 1918. Others claim that while the murderers indeed belonged to Devils of Kuhmoinen, Pihkala was not present at the time of the massacre.

Memorial of Pihkala by sculptor Nina Sailo was unveiled in 1988 on the south-east side of the Helsinki Olympic Stadium.

Pihkala was a supporter of eugenics with the goal of strengthening Finland's military.
