= Elias Simojoki =

Finnish priest and politician (1899–1940)

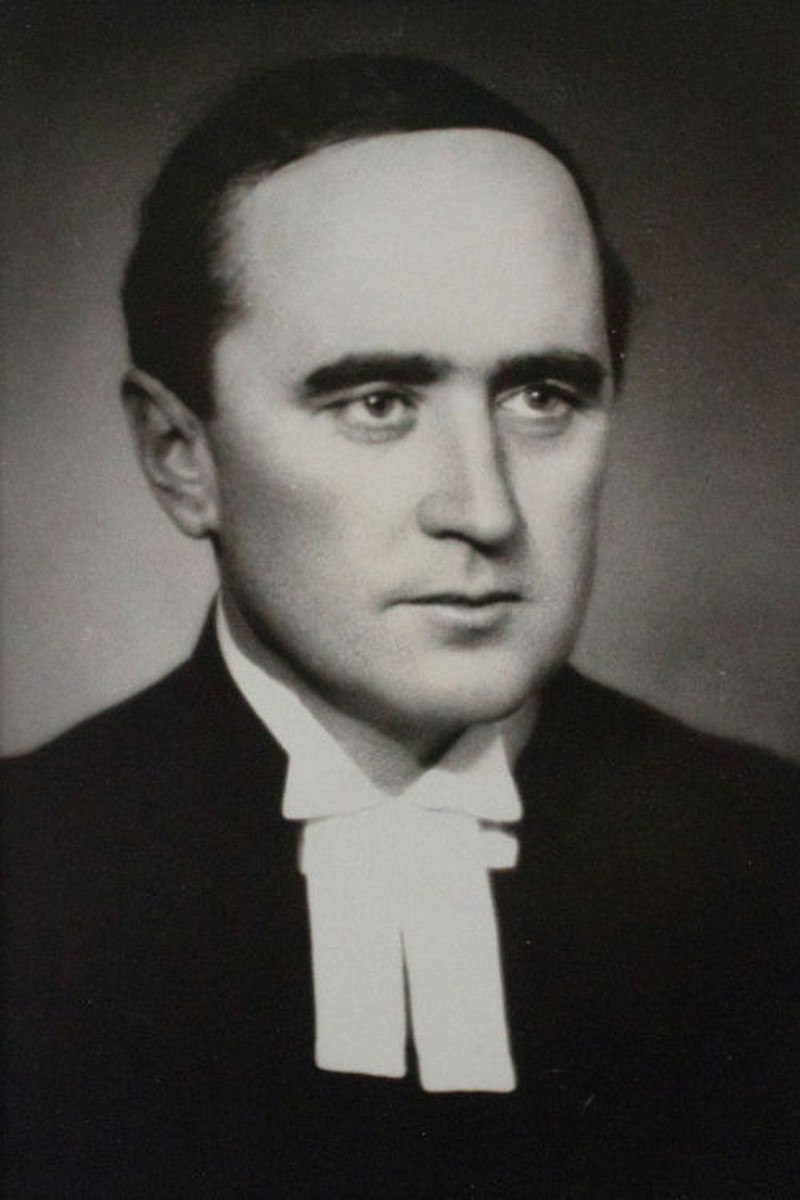

Member of Parliament
- In office 01.09.1933–31.08.1939
- Constituency: Western Electoral District of Kuopio county

Personal details
- Born: Lauri Elias Simelius; 28 January 1899 Rautio, Grand Duchy of Finland
- Died: 25 January 1940 (aged 40) Impilahti, Russian SFSR, Soviet Union
- Cause of death: Killed in action
- Citizenship: Finland
- Party: Patriotic People's Movement
- Education: Honors Degree in Theology at University of Helsinki
- Occupation: Priest
- Known for: Political activist

Military service
- Allegiance: Finland
- Branch/service: Infantry
- Years of service: 1940
- Unit: JR 39
- Battles/wars: World War II; Winter War

Lauri Elias Simojoki (28 January 1899 – 25 January 1940) was a Finnish clergyman who became a leading figure in the country's far right movement.

The son of a clergyman, Simojoki was born on 28 January 1899 in Rautio. As a youth he saw service in the struggle for Finnish independence and then with the Forest Guerrillas in East Karelia. During the Olonet expedition of 1919 he was captured at Ulvana bridge but managed to escape by diving headlong into the river. During his flight he made a vow to God that if he survived he would study theology — a promise he kept.

A student in theology at the University of Helsinki, he was one of three students — along with Erkki Räikkönen and Reino Vähäkallio — who founded the Academic Karelia Society on 22 February 1922, a paramilitary activist organisation that came to dominate student life during the interwar period. He served as chairman from 1922 to 1923 and secretary from 1923 to 1924. He advocated the union of all Finnish people into a Greater Finland whilst in this post. Strongly influenced by Russophobia, the student Simojoki addressed a rally on 'Kalevala Day' in 1923 with the slogan "In the name of Finland's lost honour and her coming greatness, death to the Ruskis."

Simojoki was ordained as a minister in 1925 and he held the chaplaincy at Kiuruvesi from 1929 until his death. He became involved with the Patriotic People's Movement and, in 1933, took command of their youth movement, Sinimustat (The Blue-and-Blacks), which looked for inspiration to similar movements amongst fascist parties in Germany and Italy. The movement was banned in 1936 due to its involvement in revolutionary activity in Estonia, although Simojoki continued to serve as a leading member of the Patriotic People's Movement. He was a Member of Parliament from 1933 to 1939. He founded a second youth group, Mustapaidat (the Black Shirts), in 1937, although this proved less successful.

When the Winter War broke out in 1939, Simojoki enlisted as a chaplain in the Finnish Army. He was killed in action on Koirinoja's ice in Impilahti, while putting down a wounded horse in no man's land. After the Finnish troops were unable to put down the horse from their positions, Simojoki skied to the horse and euthanized it with a pistol. Having done that, he was gunned down by a Soviet machine gun.
