= Academic Karelia Society =

Finnish Nationalist Organisation (1922-1944)

AKS poster

The Academic Karelia Society (Akateeminen Karjala-Seura, AKS) was a Finnish nationalist and Finno-Ugric activist organization aiming at the growth and improvement of newly independent Finland, founded by academics and students of the University of Helsinki in 1922. Its members retained influential positions in the academic life of the era as well as within the officer corps of the Army. The AKS controlled the student union of the University of Helsinki from the mid-1920s right up to 1944, when the Society was disbanded in the aftermath of the Continuation War.

== Ideological roots ==
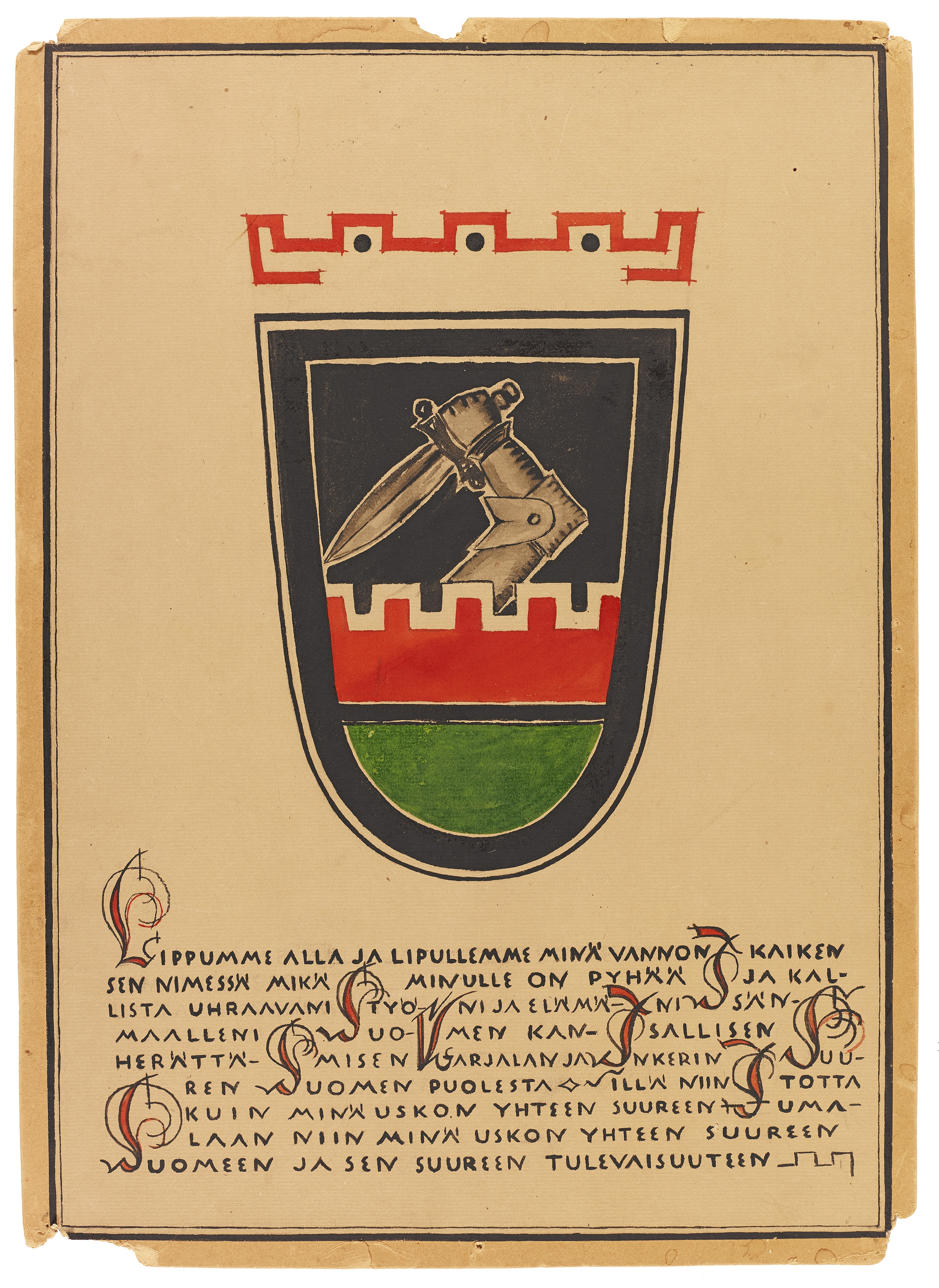
The oath board of the Academic Karelian Society 1922-1940

The political and philosophical ideology of the AKS had its main roots in the philosophy of the 19th century Fennophile statesman Johan Vilhelm Snellman who emphasized a strong national state and the need of bringing the Finnish language into the forefront of the Finnish cultural life, which was dominated almost exclusively by the Swedish language.

The nationalistic ideology of the AKS also stemmed from the common European discussion of national rights based on the Fourteen Points of President Woodrow Wilson. Also the experience of the Finnish Civil War bolstered a deep anti-socialist sentiment in the Finnish nationalist circles of that time. One of the slogans the AKS used was "Pirua ja ryssää vastaan!" (Against the devil and the Ruskies!) where the devil is referring to the Society's main domestic enemies, the socialists and communists. Despite holding views close to the Fascist movement of Italy, there was no influence from abroad - the AKS was founded in February 1922 before the March on Rome and its origins were purely domestic. The group was founded by Elias Simojoki, Erkki Räikkönen and Reino Vähäkallio.

=== Symbols ===
AKS oath swearing.

A bullet was sewn in the black AKS flag, which was the same one that had killed Repola's Lensmann Bobi Sivén (See: Aunus expedition). Sivén became a martyr of the AKS and had a cult of personality similar to that of Horst Wessel in Germany later on. Sivén was an example to the people of AKS of how the issue of Karelia is more important than one's own life, as Sivén himself had said.

Members of the AKS were sworn in before the black flag. From 1923, oaths were held twice a year, on Day of the Finnish Identity and Independence Day. In the spring of 1924, an oath was also introduced, which, in addition to the flag, became the AKS' second main rite.

The oath taken in front of the AKS black flag was as follows:

Under and to our flag I swear by all that is sacred and dear to me, to sacrifice my work and life to my Fatherland, to Finnish national awakening, for Karelia and Ingria, for Greater Finland. For as surely as I believe in one great God, I believe in Greater Finland and its great future.

== Karelia ==
Many of the founders of the AKS were veterans of the Karelian wars and thus had knowledge of the plight of the Karelian-speaking population in Soviet Karelia. The Karelians were considered to be a part of the Finnish heimo (folk) and their fate was of utmost importance for the AKS. The Academic Karelia Society's program was centered around their main demand: the acquisition of East Karelia from Soviet Russia and the liberation of the Karelian kinfolk. The work towards this goal was mainly done by propagandist efforts to keep the matter in the public eye.

AKS also organized aid to Finnic minorities in Soviet Russia and refugees from there and promoted cultural efforts to help the Finnish-speaking minorities of northern Sweden and Norway. They also tried to cultivate friendship between the newly independent states of Finland and Estonia (and, to a lesser degree, Hungary).

== Domestic policies of the AKS ==
Domestically the AKS was an emphatic proponent for a strengthened army and for strict restrictions against Socialists, although it at the same time stressed the need of improving the lot of the working classes in the interest of the national community. It also promoted the rights of the Finnish language to become the first language in the country, especially in the Universities and in the bureaucracy of the state. Initially the group was ambiguous to democracy but under the chairmanship of Vilho Helanen it came to oppose the concept. Both chairmen of the AKS, Elmo Kaila and Helanen were involved with National Socialist groups.

In the 1930s, the AKS was an ally of the ultra-right Patriotic People's Movement party. AKS also maintained close ties with a militant secret society called Vihan Veljet (Brothers of Hate). Some authors claim that Vihan Veljet was actually a group inside the AKS, not a separate organization, but there is not much evidence either way.

== Legacy of the AKS ==
After the end of World War II, the organization was labeled "fascistic" and officially disbanded in September 1944 on the order of the Allied Control Commission. The archives of AKS, which were originally located in the New Student House in the heart of Helsinki, were hidden or destroyed by its members because they were considered insignificant at the time. They contained current correspondence, publicized materials, handwritten essays, writings related to the early stage of AKS's activity.

Prominent former members include quite a few academics, bishops, business leaders, generals and politicians (e.g. president Urho Kekkonen). Many officers of the Finnish army during the wars of 1939–1940 and 1941–1944 were members of the Society. "By 1966, 41 former members of AKS had the rank of a senior officer in the Finnish army." In 1968 seven of the nine bishops of Lutheran Church of Finland were former members of AKS.

Up to the 1970's AKS influenced primarily on the cultural life of Finland according to Risto Alapuro.

== See also ==
- Karelian National Movement
