= Lapua =

Lapua Lappo
- Town
- Lapuan kaupunki Lappo stad
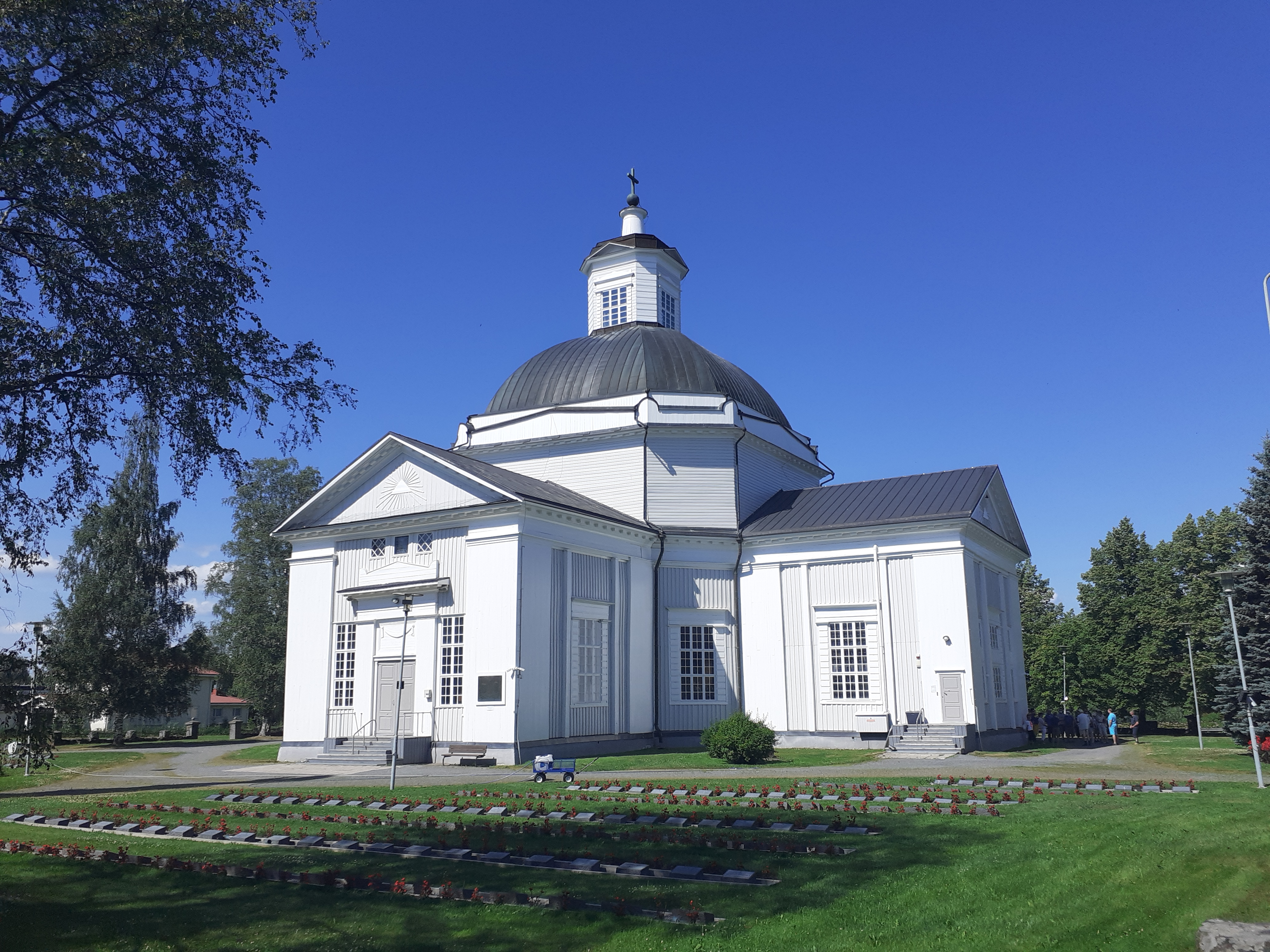
- Lapua Cathedral

- Coat of arms

- Location of Lapua in Finland
- Interactive map of Lapua
- Coordinates: 62°58′12″N 23°0′25″E
- Country: Finland
- Region: South Ostrobothnia
- Sub-region: Seinäjoki
- Charter: 1865
- Market town: 1964
- City rights: 1977

Government
  - Town manager: Satu Kankare

Area (2018-01-01)
  - Total: 751.82 km^{2} (290.28 sq mi)
  - Land: 737.16 km^{2} (284.62 sq mi)
  - Water: 13.67 km^{2} (5.28 sq mi)
  - Rank: 115th largest in Finland

Population (2025-12-31)
  - Total: 13,927
  - Rank: 79th largest in Finland
  - Density: 18.89/km^{2} (48.9/sq mi)

Population by native language
  - Finnish: 94.8% (official)
  - Swedish: 0.2%
  - Others: 5%

Population by age
  - 0 to 14: 17.8%
  - 15 to 64: 57.6%
  - 65 or older: 24.6%
- Time zone: UTC+02:00 (EET)
  - Summer (DST): UTC+03:00 (EEST)
- Website: lapua.fi/en/

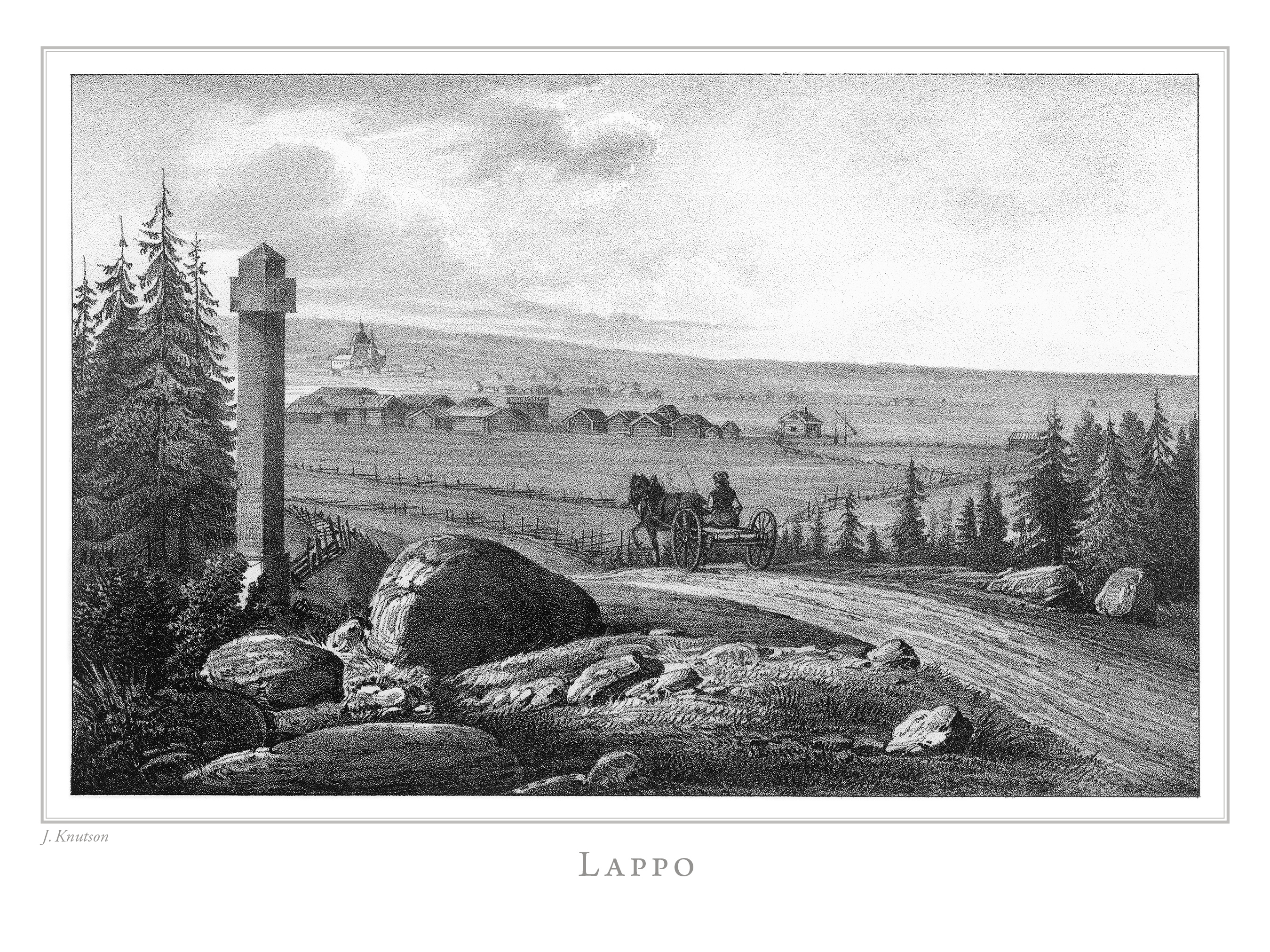
Illustration in Finland framstäldt i teckningar edited by Zacharias Topelius and published 1845–1852.

Lapua (Finnish: [ˈlɑpuɑ]; Swedish: Lappo) is a town and municipality in Finland's South Ostrobothnia region.

It is located next to the Lapua River. The town has a population of 13,927 (31 December 2025) and covers an area of 751.82 square kilometres (290.28 sq mi) of which 13.67 km^{2} (5.28 sq mi) is water. The population density is 18.89 inhabitants per square kilometre (48.9/sq mi). The municipality is unilingually Finnish.

== History ==
In the early 14th century, permanent settlement began to spread to the Lapuanjoki Valley. Residents came from, among other areas, the settlement center of Suur-Sastamala in Upper Satakunta, which had good land and water connections to the north. The focus of Ostrobothnia's settlement was initially on the lower reaches of the Kyrönjoki River. The proximity to the sea of the Kvarken area, which is rich in natural resources, was especially attractive. Lapua at that time had some Sámi people who considered the region their wilderness area. The name Lapua (Swedish: Lappo) was probably given by the coastal Swedes precisely because of the Sámi, then called Lapps, who lived in the area.

The Battle of Lapua was fought between Swedish and Russian forces near the outskirts of the town on 14 July 1808 as part of the Finnish War.

Lapua is the seat of the Evangelical Lutheran Diocese of Lapua. The Lapua Cathedral, designed by Carl Ludvig Engel, was built in 1827.

=== Lapua Movement ===
In 1929 the anti-communist and fascist Lapua Movement was founded and named after the town. The Lapua Movement was a powerful force in Lapua. They organized large rallies and marches in the town center, drawing huge crowds of supporters. Some of the movement's leaders, like Vihtori Kosola and Vilho Annala, were based in Lapua. On 30 October 1930, the Lapua March was hosted, where thousands of their paramilitary members marched through Lapua to protest against leftist threats and government policies they opposed. The Lapua movement was criminalized in 1932, and would be succeeded by the Patriotic People's Movement.

== Lapua State Cartridge Factory ==
Lapua is also home to a large ammunition factory, which commenced operations in 1927 as the State Cartridge Factory. This factory was the primary supplier of ammunition to the Finnish Army during the Winter War and World War II. An explosion occurred in a warehouse of this factory on 13 April 1976, resulting in the deaths of 40 employees. After the explosion, the factory was relocated 6 kilometres (4 mi) away from the town centre and continues production today as Nammo Lapua, part of the Nordic Ammunition Group (Nammo). The original site of the factory and the surviving buildings are now an arts centre, a library and a theater.

== International relations ==
=== Twin towns — Sister cities ===
Lapua is twinned with:

- Hagfors, Sweden
- Hohenlockstedt, Germany
- Lantana, Florida, United States
- Rakvere, Estonia
- Kiskőrös, Hungary

== Notable people ==
- Juho Annala
- Vilho Annala
- Perttu Blomgren
- Johannes Gabriel Granö
- Jukka Haapalainen
- Anneli Jäätteenmäki
- Vihtori Kosola
- Aatu Kujanpää
- Teemu Mäki
- Esko Nikkari
- Arttu Seppälä
- Ilari Seppälä
- Jutta Urpilainen

== See also ==
- .338 Lapua Magnum
- Blue Highway, an international tourist route
- Finnish national road 19
