= Patriotic People's Movement =

1932–1944 Finnish ultranationalist party

Patriotic People's Movement Isänmaallinen kansanliike
- Abbreviation: IKL
- Founders: Erkki Räikkönen... and others: Herman Gummerus; Vilho Annala; Bruno Salmiala
- Founded: 5 June 1932; 94 years ago
- Dissolved: 23 September 1944; 82 years ago
- Preceded by: Lapua Movement
- Succeeded by: IKL (1993) (Note: (not legal successor))
- Headquarters: Mikonkatu 15, Helsinki
- Newspaper: Ajan Suunta
- Youth wing: Blue-and-Blacks (Note: (1930-1936)); Blackshirts (Note: (1936-1939))
- Trade union: National Trade Union Confederation of Finland
- Membership: 100,000 (1930’s est.)
- Ideology: Greater Finland; Finnish ultranationalism Fascism; Corporate statism Factions: Nazism
- Political position: Far-right
- Colours: Black White Blue
- Anthem: "Luo Lippujen" (lit. 'Rally to the flags!')
- Most MPs in the Parliament (1936): 14 / 200

Patriotic People's Movement (Finnish: Isänmaallinen kansanliike, IKL, Swedish: Fosterländska folkrörelsen) was a Finnish nationalist and anti-communist political party. IKL was the successor of the previously banned Lapua Movement. It existed from 1932 to 1944 and had an ideology similar to its predecessor, except that IKL participated in elections with limited success.

== History ==
=== Formation ===
The IKL was founded at a conference on 5 June 1932 as a continuation of the Lapua Movement. The three major founding members were Herman Gummerus, Vilho Annala and Erkki Räikkönen. Lapua leader Vihtori Kosola was imprisoned for his part in the Mäntsälä rebellion at the time of formation but the leadership was officially kept in reserve for him and other leading rebels, notably Annala and Bruno Salmiala, were involved in the formation of IKL.

=== Relationship to mainstream politics ===
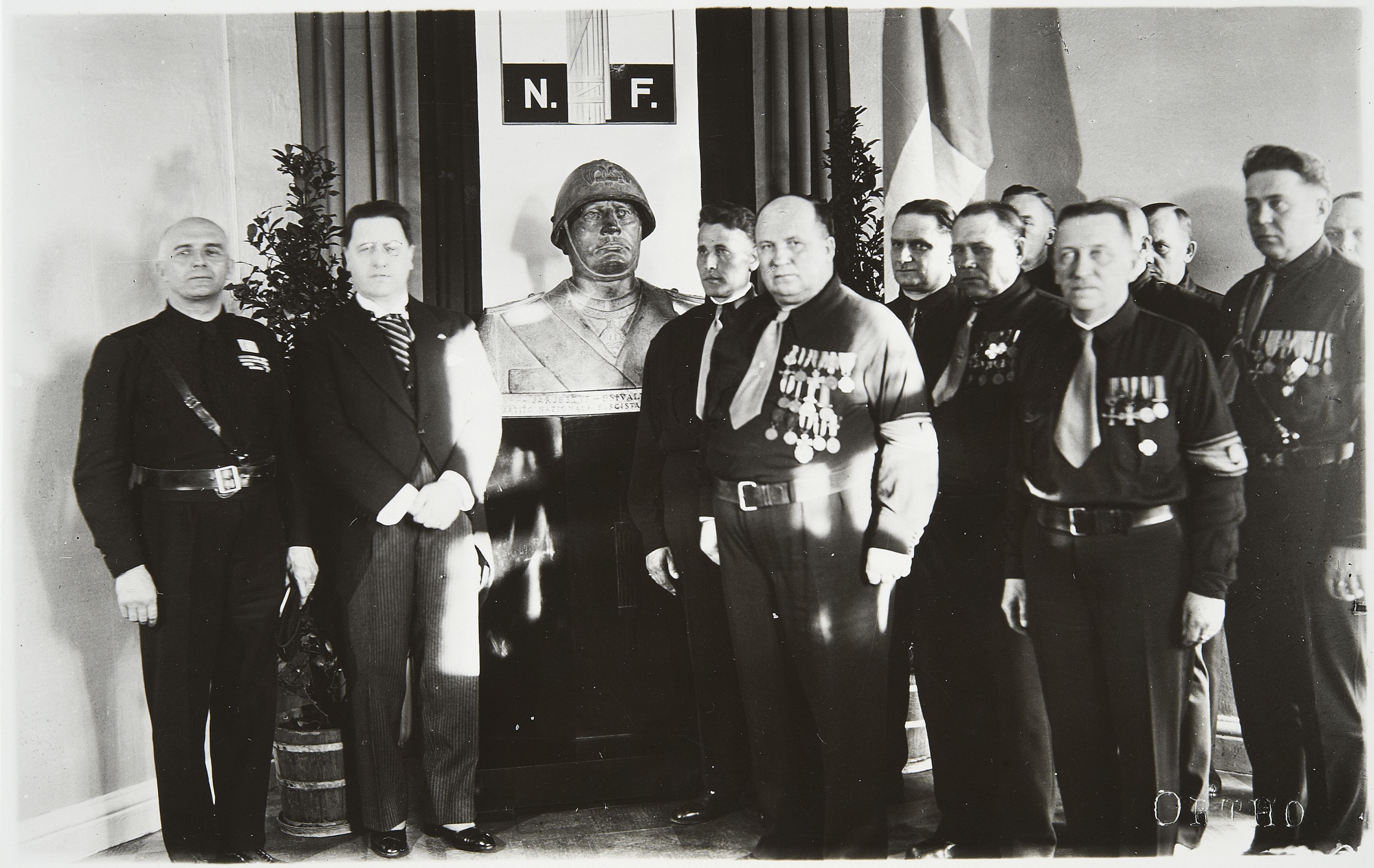
IKL leadership receiving a bust of Mussolini from an Italian delegation on 7 June 1933. From left: Italian special envoy Gray, Italian ambassador Tamaro, Vilho Annala, Vihtori Kosola, Bruno Salmiala, Juhana Malkamäki, Eino Tuomivaara

IKL participated in parliamentary elections. In 1933 its election list was pooled with the National Coalition Party (Kokoomus), and got 14 seats out of 200. Kokoomus collapsed from 42 to 18 seats. After the collapse, Juho Kusti Paasikivi was elected chairman of Kokoomus. He converted his party to the voice of big business and as such had no interest in the direct action tactics of IKL, and thus weeded out the most outspoken IKL sympathizers from the party.

IKL came under increasing scrutiny from government and was subject to two laws designed to arrest its progress. In 1934, a law passed allowing the suppression of propaganda which brought government or constitution into contempt and this was used against the movement, whilst the following year a law banning political uniforms and private uniformed organisations came in, seriously affecting the Sinimustat in particular.

IKL kept its 14 seats in the elections of 1936 but was weakened by the overwhelming victory for the coming social democrat-agrarian coalition, under Prime Minister Aimo Kaarlo Cajander that would replace in the spring of 1937 the centrist minority government of Kyösti Kallio, which had, in turn, replaced the narrow right-wing minority government of Toivo Mikael Kivimäki. The strong new government soon moved against the IKL, with Urho Kekkonen, then Minister of the Interior, bringing legal proceedings against the movement late in 1938. However, the courts did not find sufficient grounds for banning IKL. Despite this the prosperity experienced under Cajander's government hit the IKL and in the 1939 elections they managed only eight seats. Kekkonen was one of two leading government opponents of the IKL who would later go on to serve as presidents of Finland, the other being Juho Kusti Paasikivi.

According to docent André Swanström, IKL was by far the most popular party among Finnish Waffen SS recruits.

=== Final years ===
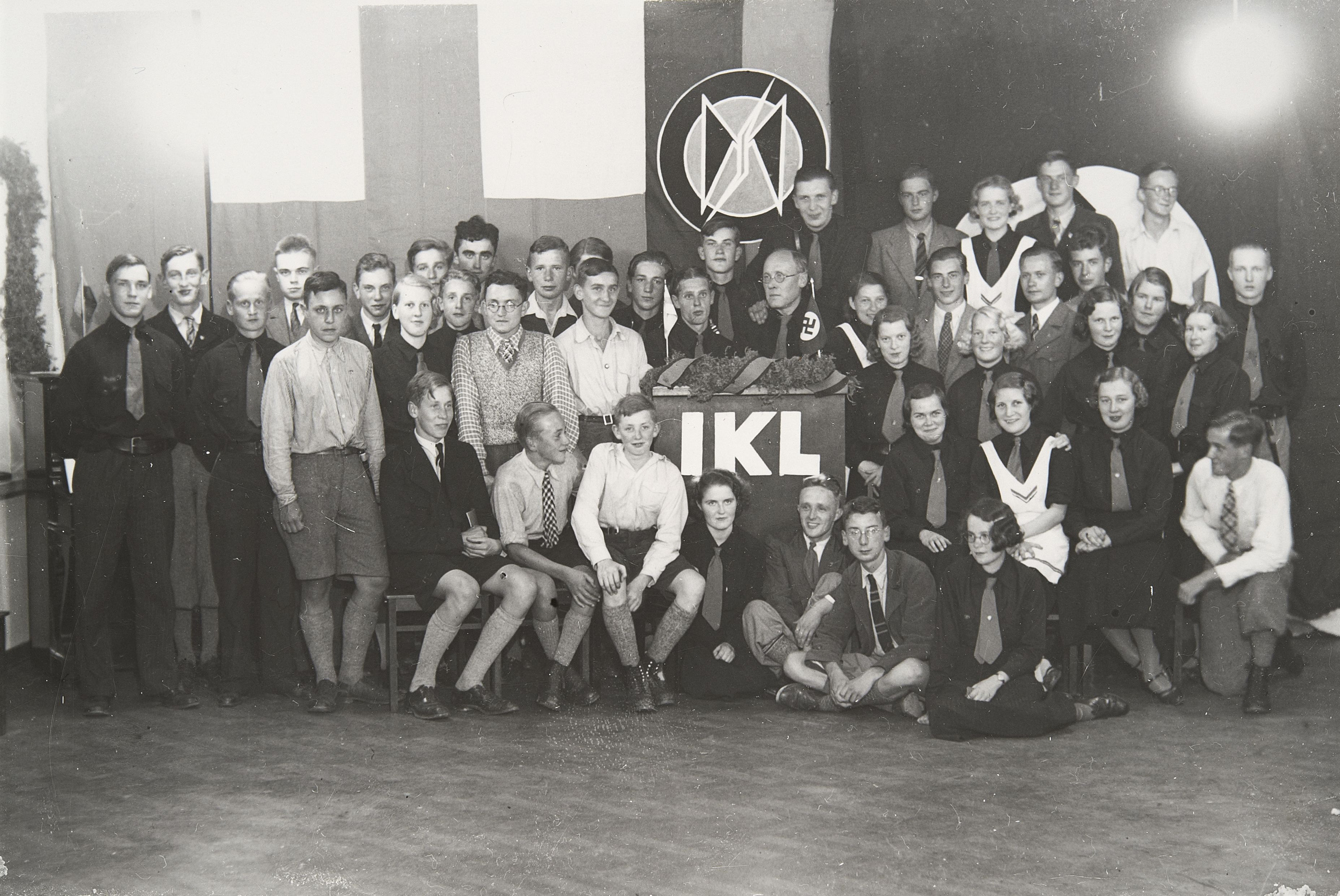
Hitlerjugend as guests of the IKL in Finland on 7 August 1934.

The Winter War, and particularly the Moscow Peace, were seen by IKL and its sympathizers as the ultimate proof of the parliamentary government's failed foreign policy. During the year after the Winter War, Finland's foreign policy was drastically changed, by and large to correspond with that of IKL, and Annala was even included in the Cabinet in January 1941, when all but one parties of the parliament were represented. The price of this recognition was however an end to IKL attacks on the system and as such an effective end to the very reason it had support. After the initial enthusiasm of the Continuation War in 1941 waned during the first winter, IKL wasn't included in Edwin Linkomies' cabinet in spring 1943.

In the aftermath of the Continuation War, IKL was banned, on the insistence of the Soviet Union, four days after the armistice between Finland and the Soviet Union was signed 19 September 1944.

=== Legacy ===
The IKL initials returned to the far-right political scene in 1993 with the foundation of the Isänmaallinen Kansallis-Liitto by Matti Järviharju. The new movement died out by 1998.

== Ideology ==
Ideologically, IKL was ardently nationalist and anti-communist, and endorsed an aggressive foreign policy against the Soviet Union and hostility towards the Swedish language. The creation of a Greater Finland was an important goal for the party. Its manifested purpose was to be the Christian-moral conscience of the parliament. A more hard-line tendency was also active, centered on Bruno Salmiala.

== Organization ==
=== Structure ===
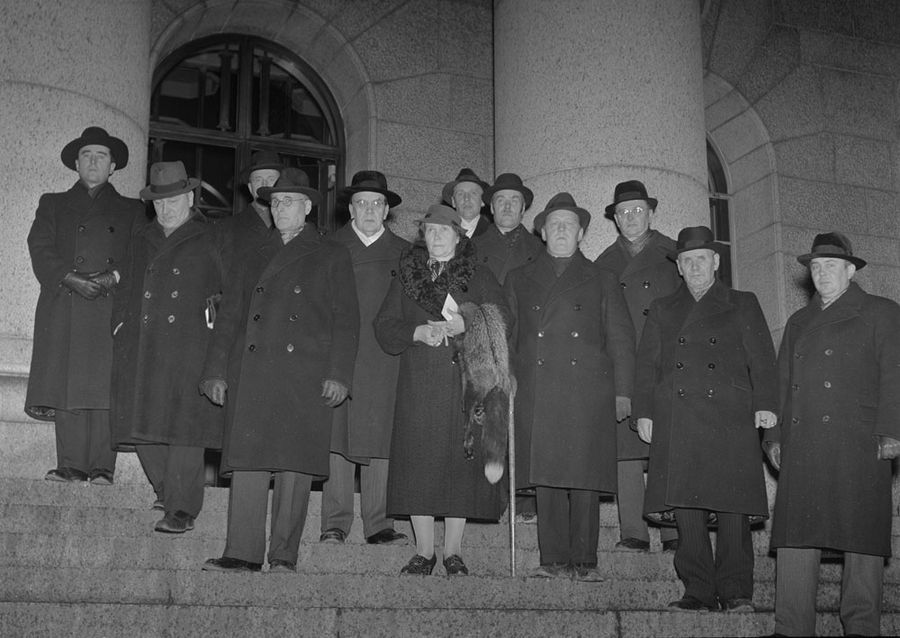
IKL parliamentary group standing in front of the Eduskunta.

Many of its leaders were priests or participants of the mainly Ostrobothnian Pietist movement called Herännäisyys.

=== Symbols and uniforms ===
The IKL uniform was a black shirt with blue tie, inspired by the Italian fascists, and also by the Herännäisyys movement, which had a tradition for black clothing. Members greeted each other with a Roman salute.

=== Youth wing ===
The IKL had its own youth organization, called Sinimustat (Blue-and-blacks), members of which were trained in combat. It was led by Elias Simojoki, a charismatic priest. Sinimustat were banned in 1936 (although they were immediately reformed as Mustapaidat ("Blackshirts")).

=== Support ===
The party received its main support from wealthy farmers, the educated middle-class, civil servants, the Lutheran clergy and university students. Geographically, IKL obtained its largest share of votes in Southern Ostrobothnian municipalities such as Kuortane, Lapua and Ilmajoki.

==== Notable IKL supporters ====
- Arne Somersalo, Commander of the Finnish Airforce 1920–26, IKL MP
- Paavo Susitaival, Lt. Col., IKL MP
- Paavo Talvela, General
- Rolf Nevanlinna, Mathematician, Professor, Rector of the University of Helsinki
- Vilho Lampi, painter
- Elias Simojoki, clergyman, IKL MP.
- Hilja Riipinen, the only women MP.

== Election results ==
=== Parliament of Finland ===
Date	Votes			Seats		Position	Size
Date	#	%	± pp	#	±	Position	Size
1936	97,891	8.34%	+ 8.34	14 / 200	▲14	Opposition	5th
1939	86,219	6.65%	1.66	8 / 200	▼6	Opposition	5th

Gallery

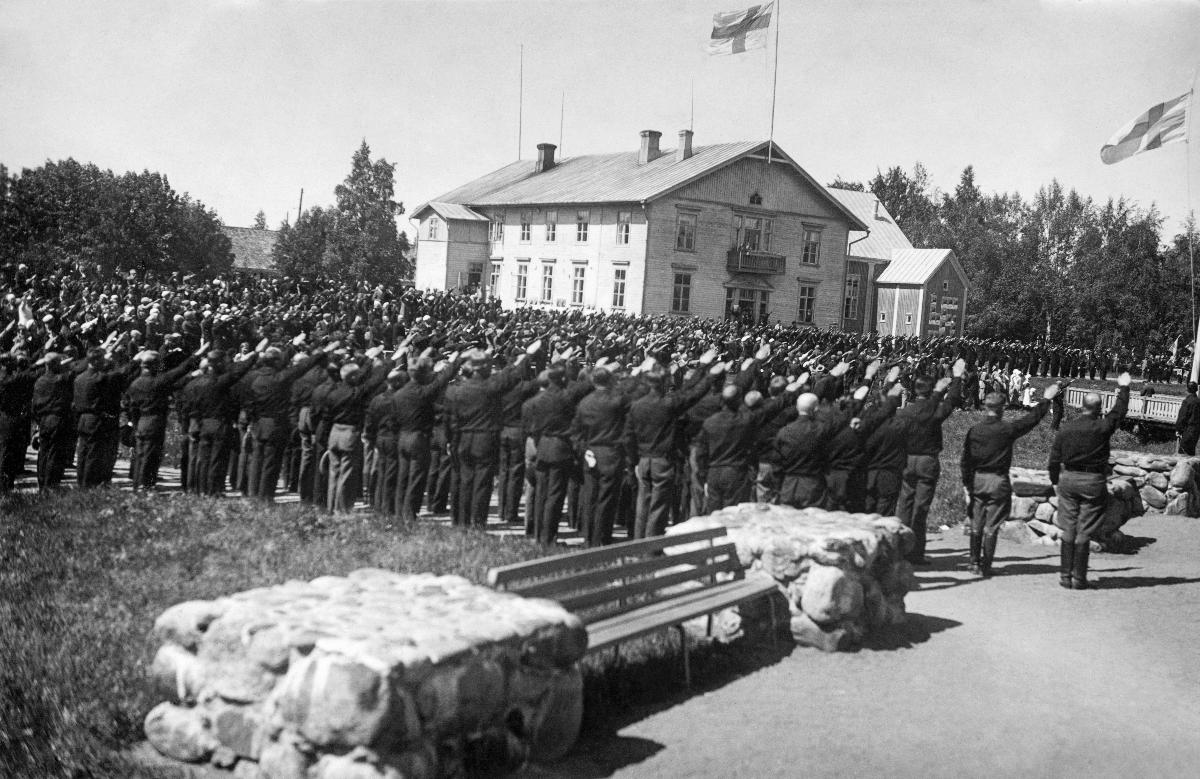
Members of IKL saluting at the statue of Jaakko Ilkka

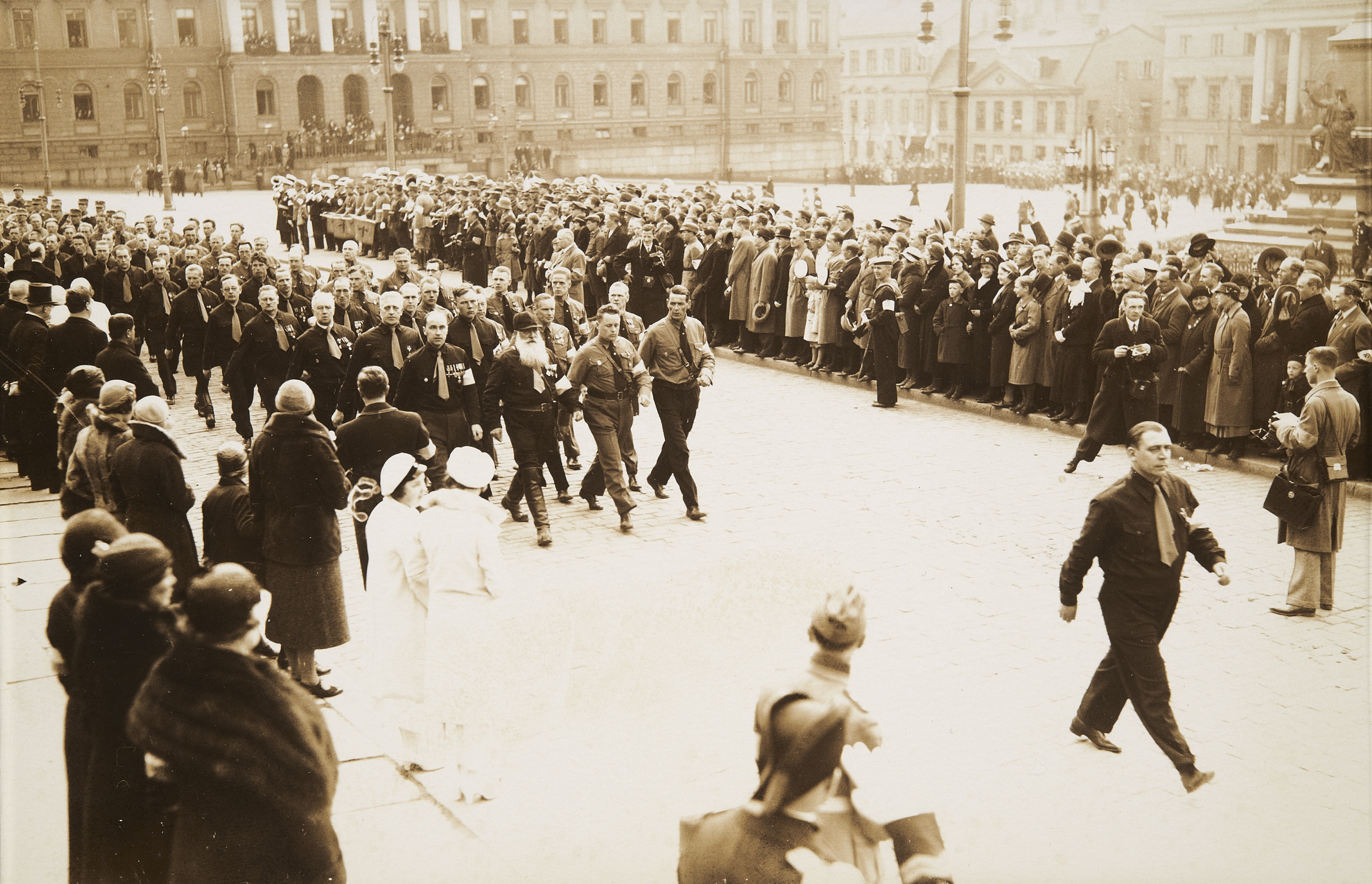
15th anniversary of White Victory Parade, SKJ and IKL marching

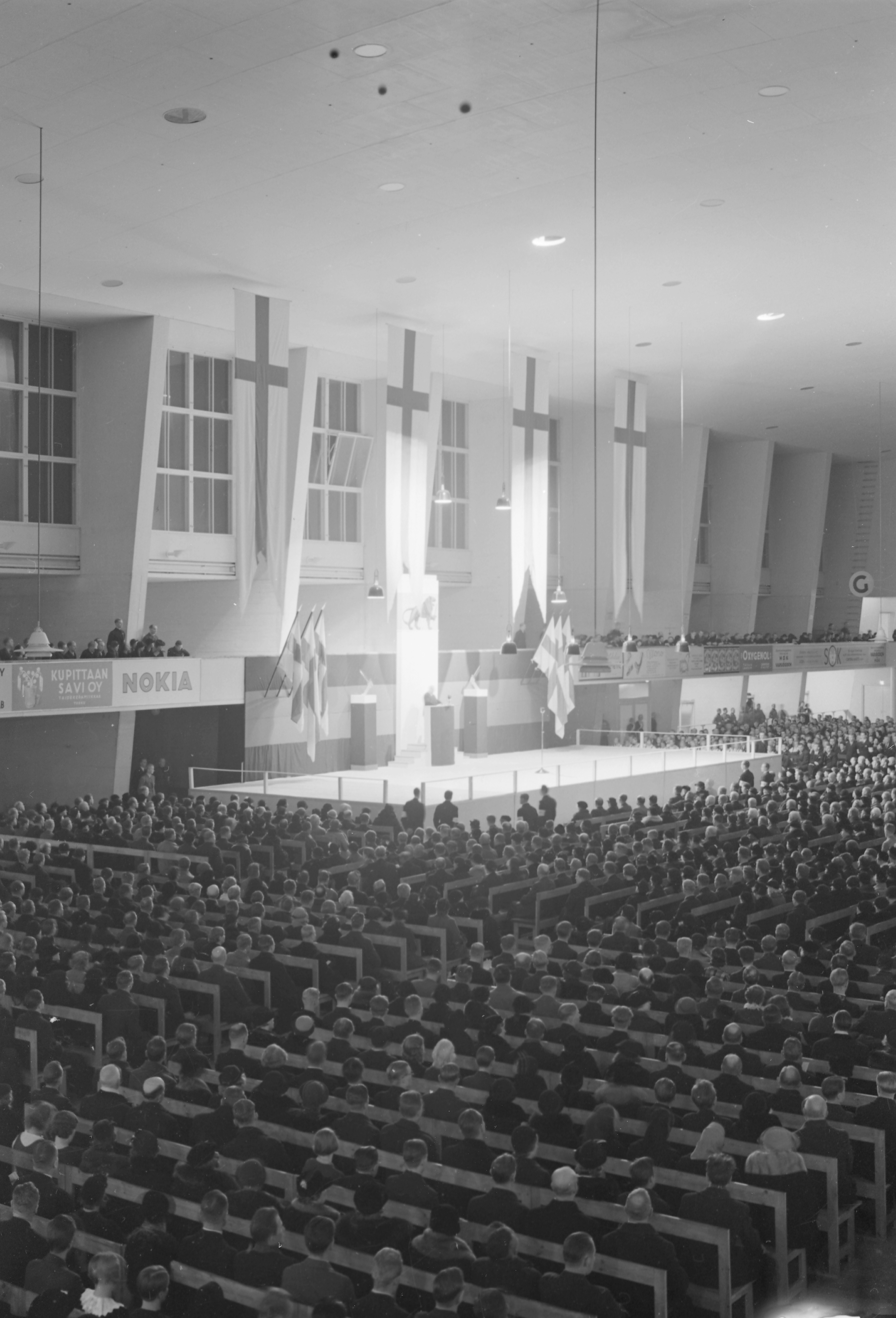
IKL meeting in 1936

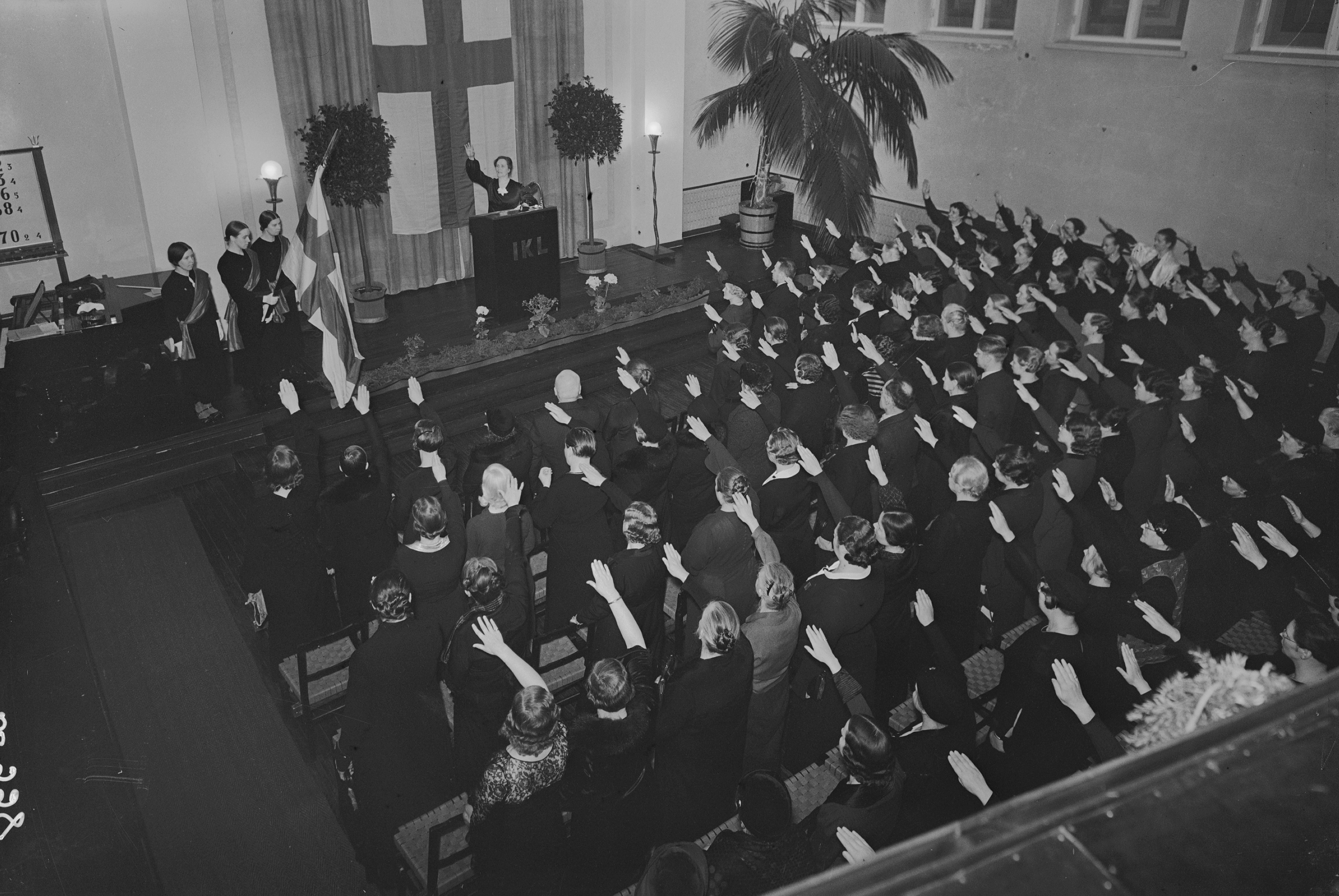
IKL women's meeting

== See also ==
- History of Finland
- Academic Karelia Society
