= Finnish-German Society =

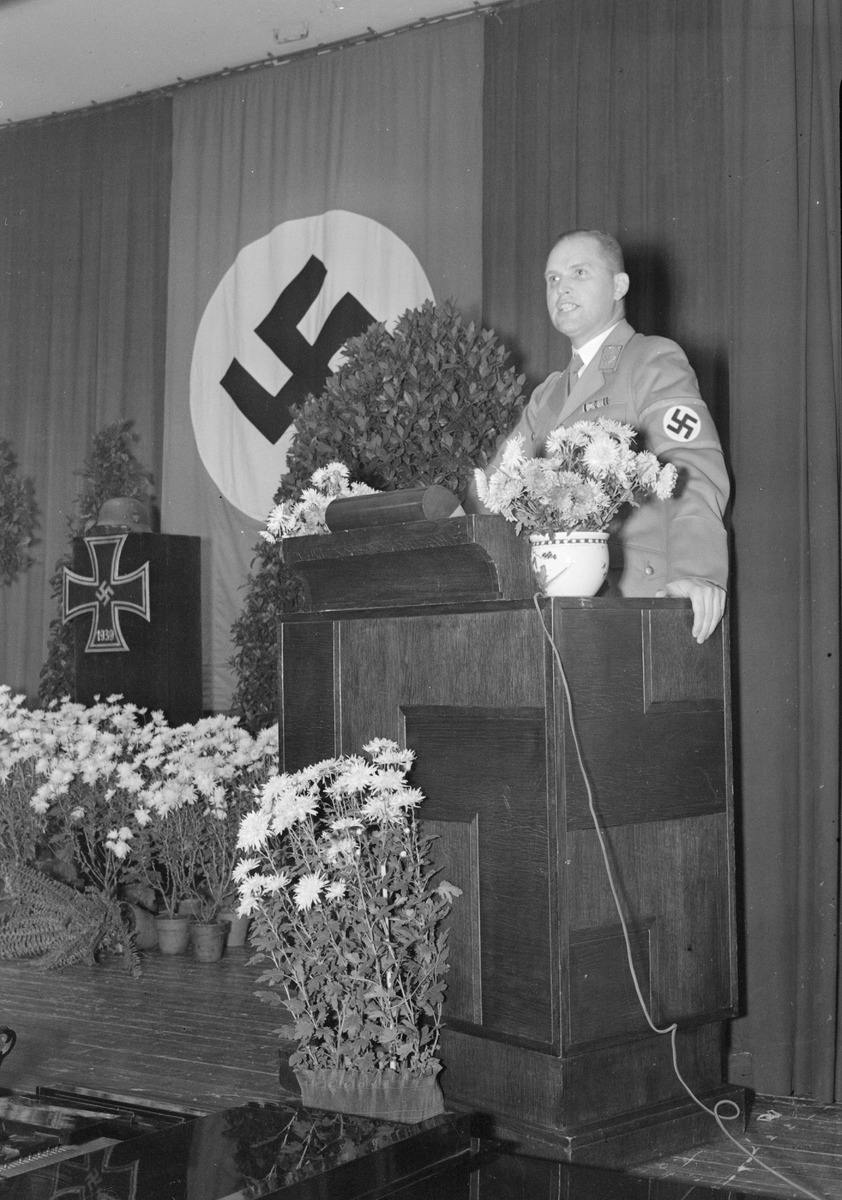
Nazi Party officer holding a speech in Helsinki

The Finnish-German Society (Finnish: Suomalais-Saksalainen seura, SSS) was a friendship society maintaining and cultivating ties between Finland and Germany. It was set up in 1918 in the wake of the brotherhood-in-arms in Finnish Civil War. The society saw most activity during the World War II at a time when it sought to tie Finland more tightly to Nazi German interests. Many influential Finns participated in its activities. The SSS was abolished in September 1944, when there was a diplomatic break in the relations between Finland and Germany.

== Activity in the 1920s and 1930s ==
The activity of the SSS prior to second world war consisted of organizing festivities on the anniversary of the liberation of Helsinki, presentations and maintaining ties with Germans living in Finland. SSS also maintained contacts with the German veterans of the civil war living in Finland like Count Rüdiger von der Goltz.

When the Nazi Party rose to power SSS maintained ties with it and invited many important people in the party to visit Finland.

== World War II ==
In 1940, the SSS renewed its organization. Subdivisions set up across Finland led the club to start changing from elitist ”gentleman club ” towards a mass organization. In 1943, the club had 28 sub-sections and about 4 300 members. Large amount of donations guaranteed SSS's finances.

SSS was involved in the recruitment of Finns as volunteers for Waffen-SS. The members of the SSS central to recruitment activities included Esko Riekki and Pehr Norrmén.

During the Continuation War SSS maintained contacts with Finnish and German government and military circles and sought to bring Finland's policies closer to Germany's. The club also invited many National Socialists leaders to Finland for speaking trips.

The members of the SSS included many very prominent people of Finnish politics, the economy, science and culture. They included, among others, PM Edwin Linkomies, Rolf Nevanlinna, Arvo Ylppö, Väinö Auer, Yrjö Reenpää, PM Antti Hackzell, Tyko Reinikka, Yrjö Kilpinen and Maila Talvio. Principals of the Åbo Akademi and University of Turku Andersson and Granö were also members.

Wilhelm Jahre, the leader of the Finnish section of the Nazi Party/Foreign Organization was a member of the board of the SSS. John Rosberg, a prominent Finnish Nazi was another board member.

=== German congregation and SSS ===
The leader of the Helsinki German Lutheran congregation and the founder of the Deutsch-Evangelisch in Finnland (German Evangelicals in Finland) magazine Friedrich Israel (later Ostarhild) was a member of the SSS and his magazine depicted Adolf Hitler and Benito Mussolini as "good Christians". The vicar Namenhauer of the German Evangelical Lutheran Congregation gave speeches in the events of SSS, and the congregation started to support the German Christian movement after the Nazi assumption of power. Namenhauer even compared Hitler's call to abandon individualism and put the nation before oneself similar to Jesus telling Nicodemus that one must be "born from above". The German congregation in Finland was closely associated with SSS and its leaders lobbied the Nazi leadership for support for Finland in the Winter War, Vicars Namenhauer (Helsinki), Siegfried (Viipuri) and Sentzke (Turku) directly appealing to Hitler.

=== Suomi-Saksa ===
Suomi-Saksa cultural magazine, Joseph Goebbels with a Finnish SS man on cover

SSS also distributed Suomi-Saksa (Finland-Germany) magazine that featured over 400 German and Finnish authors during its run. The magazine promoted National Socialism. In its first issue, in the foreword it explained its purpose as "to serve cooperation between the new Finland and the new Germany". Finland's role in the "war between Western culture and Eastern barbarism" and in the new Europe was emphasized, as was the brotherhood-in-arms established in 1918 and revived in the summer of 1941 as a bridge between Finland and Germany. Chairman of SSS and former Finnish minister Bernhard Wuolle and Johannes Öhquist were promoters of the Nazi cause and prominently contributed to the magazine.

== Dissolution ==
Following the break of relations between Finland and Germany in early autumn 1944, it was decided to abolish the SSS because the purpose of the club, maintaining cultural relations between countries, was no longer possible. The property of the club was donated to the Finnish Cultural Foundation.

== Successor organizations ==
The former commander of the Finnish navy Gustav von Schoultz was the chairman of Finland Alliance, a Nazi organization founded in 1944 for the Finns living in Nazi Germany and its occupied areas. Other prominent members were SS officer Claes Purjo, Baroness Ruth Munck and Ahnenerbe member Yrjö von Grönhagen.

Helsinki Finnish-German Association founded in 1960 states that it is continuing the legacy of the SSS and has some 800 members.
