= Patriotic Citizens of Viitasaari =

Finnish organization

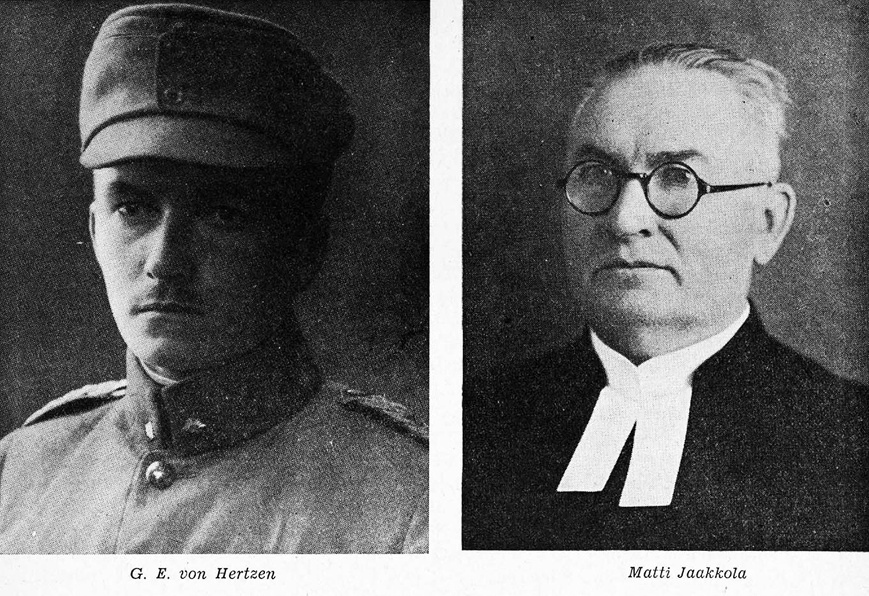

The Patriotic Citizens of Viitasaari (Finnish: Viitasaaren Isänmaalliset Kansalaiset) was an organization operating in Viitasaari in Central Finland. The association was one of the first prominent, explicitly antisemitic and anti-Masonic organizations in Finland. From 1928 to 1930, the group was run by Gunnar von Hertzen, a municipal physician.

Between 1930 and 1939, the Citizens published seven booklets warning of the dangers posed by Communism, Jews, and Freemasons. The Citizens' publications were characterized by strong antisemitism.

The group included several far-right people living in Viitasaari. The founders of the group were the pastor of Viitasaari, Dean Matti Jaakkola, the chaplain Heikki Halmesmäki, local doctor, the Jäger Major Gunnar von Hertzen, the farmers Einar Sarlin and Kalle Varis and the bank manager Aapeli Tikkanen. Of the founders, at least Jaakkola and Halmesmäki had been involved in the Lapua movement's kidnapping operations. Halmesmäki also served as the editor-in-chief of the newspaper Sisä-Suomi and published and edited the Viitasaaren Seutu magazine from 1933 to 1944.

The books published by the group had used mainly German literature as sources, but the text had been adapted to Finnish conditions. The first booklet, The Jewish Part in World Events, was published in 1930 and had a first run of 10,000 copies.

According to the Citizens, the Jews were behind communism, socialism, Freemasonry, and liberalism, and they took advantage of these movements to gain power. The Jews already supposedly ruled the Soviet Union and from there financed communist activities around the world. Both communism and international capitalism were Jewish-led and contributed to the emergence of the Jewish world power. According to the people of Viitasaari, the Jews had already brought about the First World War and they were already planning to start a new war. If the Jews won this war, they would rule the whole world, but if they lost it, they would fall to the "level of the current gypsies."

Pastor Jaakkola also wrote actively on the same topic in the magazines Sinimusta, Aktivisti, Tapparamies, Siniristi and Kustaa Vaasa.

== Citizens' booklets ==
- Juutalaisten osuus maailmantapahtumiin. (The Jewish Part in World Events) Viitasaaren isänmaallisten kansalaisten lentolehtinen N:o 1. Jyväskylä 1930
- Kommunismin kulissien takaa. (Communism behind the scenes) Viitasaaren isänmaallisten kansalaisten lentolehtinen N:o 2. Jyväskylä 1930
- Vapaamuurariuden kulissien takaa. (Freemasonry behind the scenes) Viitasaaren isänmaallisten kansalaisten lentokirjanen N:o 3. Jyväskylä 1930
- Juutalais-antikristillinen maailmanvallankumousohjelma (Jew-Antichristian world revolutionary plan). Viitasaaren isänmaallisten kansalaisten lentokirjanen N:o 4. Jyväskylä 1931
- Paul Timm: Vapaamuurariuden kaksoiskasvot : entisen vapaamuurarin paljastuksia koskien vapaamuurariuden rituaaleja ja päämaalia (Two faces of Freemasonry: Revelations by ex-freemasons concerning freemason rituals and goals), suomentanut M. J. Viitasaaren isänmaallisten kansalaisten lentokirjanen N:o 4a. Jyväskylä 1932
- Vapaamuurariuden julkinen ja salainen ohjelma 400:n vapaamuurarilausunnon valossa. (The public and secret plan of Freemasonry in the light of 400 freemason statements) Viitasaaren isänmaallisen kerhon lentokirja N:o 5. Jyväskylä 1933
- Punainen vai valkoinen rintama? (White or Red Front?) Viitasaaren isänmaallisen kerhon lentokirja N:o 7. Jyväskylä 1939
