= Karl Jansson =

Finnish writer

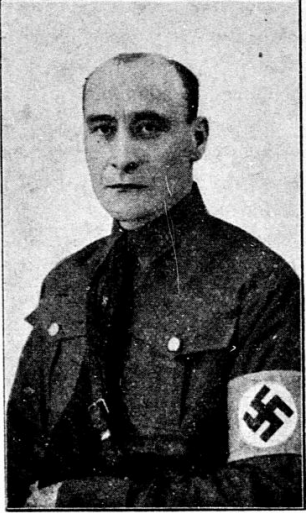
Jansson in 1933

Karl Algot Jansson ( October 30, 1898 Lohja – June 29, 1963) was a Finnish journalist and radical right-wing activist.

== Life and career ==
In 1917, Jansson joined the cavalry section of the White Guard established in Lohja and later, along with the civil war, he took part in Aunus expedition. In the 1930s, Jansson participated in the activities of the Lapua Movement, the Nazi Finnish People's Organisation (SKJ) party founded by Arvi Kalsta and was the editor of the Rintamamies magazine published by the Front Soldier League. Jansson also wrote for the "Hakkorset" of SKJ. In September 1939, Jansson was part of the Front Soldier League delegation to Germany together with bank manager Pehr Norrmén and engineer John Rosberg. The delegation met with SS Reichfuhrer Heinrich Himmler. Jansson also visited Germany in the fall of 1940 with Jaeger Lieutenant Gunnar Lindqvist to present to the SS an invitation from Front Soldier League to send convalescent SS troops to Finland for convalescent vacations. Jansson also visited Leibstandarte-SS Adolf Hitler barracks and wrote a glowing article about the SS for Rintamamies. The same year he took part in recruiting for the Finnish Waffen SS.

In his role as a journalist, he attacked the Swedish People's Party of Finland for "falling for Anglo-Saxon propaganda" and "[separating] the Swedish ethnic group from the national community in this country", which in turn would prevent "this population from creating its own path of destiny in harmony with and [within] the framework of the new Europe". In the spring of 1942, Jansson was elected chairman of the Swedish-language Nazi organization People's Community Society. In the fall of 1944, Jansson was part of the leadership of Sonderkommando Nord in Finland and he worked as a liaison and special agent in the area of Kristinestad and Närpes. During 1944–1945, Jansson lived in Kristinestad's hotel Kaupunginhotelli, which also housed the Sonderkommando Nord's secret radio station, which managed connections to Germany, and was managed by SS man Timo Räihä. The activities of the Sonderkommando Nord were revealed in the fall of 1945 and the state police started the arrests of those involved in the activity around 1946. However, Jansson was able to escape to Sweden, where he lived for the rest of his life. At the end of the 1950s, he was a job broker in the Hudiksvall region at lumber sites, and he died of cancer in 1963. Jansson's military rank was lieutenant.
