= John Rosberg =

Finnish engineer and far-right activist (1891–1960)

John Rosberg (September 9, 1891 - June 3, 1960) was a Finnish engineer and technical director of the Helsinki Telephone Association who was involved in far-right activities in the 1930s and 1940s.

Rosberg's parents were Fredrik Rosberg, an engineer, CEO of the Helsinki Telephone Association, and Johanna Alvina Witting. He was the technical director of the Helsinki Telephone Association and was the initiator of the automation of the Helsinki telephone network in the 1920s. The first subscribers were connected to the Töölö automatic telephone exchange in July 1922, and the entire telephone network of the city of Helsinki was automated by 1929.

Rosberg was involved in the Aktiva studentförbundet and the Svensk Botten published by it. He also participated in the activities of the Front Soldier League and had good relations with National Socialist Germany. In September 1939, the League's activists Rosberg, bank manager Pehr Norrmén, and Karl Jansson, editor of the League's magazine Rintamasotilas (Front Soldier), took part in a delegation led by Esko Riekki that visited Germany. The delegation met Heinrich Himmler and upon returning reported to Foreign Minister Eljas Erkko, former President Pehr Evind Svinhufvud and the leadership of the Front Soldier League.

After the Winter War, Rosberg became a member of the board of the Finnish-German Society and visited Germany again in July 1940. According to Colonel Walter Horn, the then Finnish military ombudsman in Berlin, Rosberg had "excellent connections with the Nazis in Germany, one of the faithful in the fight for Finnish-German cooperation". During the Continuation War, Rosberg participated in the activities of the People's Community Society, and in the fall of 1944 he was arrested by Valpo with some other far-right leaders.

After the wars, John Rosberg was still involved in the network of far-right Finno-Swedes, which included C. A. J. Gadolin, a docent at Åbo Akademi University, Carl-Gustaf Herlitz, director of the Arabian Porcelain Factory, and Eric von Born, who fled to Sweden. The network sought to establish links with similar far-right circles in Sweden.

John Rosberg was married to Lyoka Truhart (1897–1946). Lyoka Rosberg visited Germany in the spring of 1935 and published a travel book "Ett folk bygger upp" (Söderström & Co, 1936), which welcomed Nazism.
