= Siniristi =

1930s Nazi magazine published in Finland

Siniristi (Blue Cross)
- Type: Weekly magazine
- Format: Tabloid
- Editor-in-chief: Tauno E. Einiö 1931–1933 Tahvo Liljeblad 1933; Toivo Karanko 1934–1938; Y. W. Jalander 1938–1939 Björn Smeds 1939
- Founded: 1931
- Ceased publication: 1939
- Political alignment: Nazism
- Language: Finnish language
- Country: Finland

Siniristi (Finnish: Blue Cross, until 1933 Tapparamies, (Finnish: the Axman)) was a Finnish Nazi magazine published between 1931 and 1939 and published by Publishing Company Oy Vasara that was operated by Gunnar von Hertzen and Y. W. Jalander. Its material consisted mainly of antisemitic propaganda adopted from Nazi Germany. The authors of the magazine included the well-known Finnish-Swedish Nazi Thorvald Oljemark.

Siniristi was a deeply antisemitic magazine, and its antisemitism was mainly based on Christian antisemitism, which was the dominant current in Finnish society. Tahvo Liljeblad published many articles on the relations of Christians and Jews: to him Jesus was the most powerful opponent of the Jews and was killed for challenging the teachings of the rabbis "which are fatal to humanity". As punishment the Jews were cursed and scattered by God. In 1933 Siniristi published an exposé on the Talmud which supposedly contained attacks on Christianity, because the Jews understood Christianity stood against their world-conquest plans.

As Tapparamies the magazine lasted a few years, but it reinvented itself as Siniristi in 1933. To stress the continuity it sported the same subtitle: "Battle Magazine for the Fatherland, the Fortune of the People and the Faith of the Fathers". Siniristi also used other sub-headings to declare its political outlook, such as "Battle Magazine against Jewish Imperialism". While Tapparamies had been an outgrowth of Patriotic Citizens of Viitasaari, when the magazine transferred under the editorship of Björn Smeds who was employed by German intelligence, it became purely a mouthpiece of the German Nazi Party.

In 1939 Siniristi was replaced by Kustaa Vaasa magazine.

== Archives ==
- National Library digital archives of Tapparamies
- National Library digital archives of Siniristi
