= Claes Purjo =

Finnish CEO and SS volunteer (1918–1996)

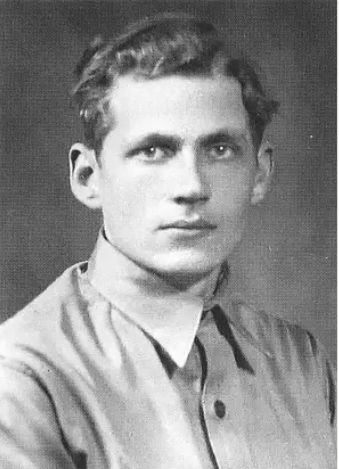

Bror Claes Purjo (January 10, 1918 – March 27, 1996) was a Finnish CEO and SS volunteer, born in Helsinki, who was involved in the pro-German resistance movement in Finland from 1944 to 1946.

== World War II ==
In the summer of 1941, Purjo joined the Finnish SS volunteer battalion, where he rose to the rank of SS-Obersturmführer. Purjo remained in Germany on secondment even after the Finnish SS battalion had been repatriated at the beginning of June 1943. He was first employed by the maintenance office of SS-Verbindungstelle Finland, and in the spring of 1944 he moved to Berlin to SS-Hauptamt Verbindungstelle Finland. Purjo, who was pro-German and supported National Socialism, had good connections with Germany's political and military leadership. According to a report made by Valpo in 1945, Purjo had said that after Finland concluded the armistice in September 1944, he was the only official representative of Finland in Germany.

Purjo was also a member of the leadership of the pro-German Finland Union, founded by Finns living in Berlin, together with Admiral Gustav von Schoultz, Baroness Ruth Munck and professor Johannes Öhquist.

At the beginning of October 1944, during the Lapland War, Purjo and SS-Hauptsturmführer, Jouko Itälä, arrived in Rovaniemi via Norway to recruit Finnish soldiers captured by the Germans into the Finnish SS Company. Purjo also organized recruitment activities in Finland, and he also planned to start sabotage activities here. In the fall of 1944, Purjo was also an announcer for Radio Vapaa Suomi, which operated from Berlin. In the final stages of the war, in the spring of 1945, Purjo fled from Germany to Norway. He was arrested in Norway, but managed to escape and moved to Sweden.

== In the Foreign Legion ==
Later, Purjo served in the French Foreign Legion in North Africa and Indochina from 1946 to 1950. After the war, Valpo suspected Purjo and two other former SS men, Kaj Laurell and Unto Parvilahti, of treason, but Purjo, who had left the country, was not questioned until 1950.

== Return to Finland ==
After his return to Finland, Purjo acted as the CEO of the insurance companies, Aarni-Liikenne and Yksityisyrittäjäin vakuutusyhtiö.
