= Blue Cross (society) =

Blue Cross Siniristi
- Chairman: Erkki Räikkönen
- Founded: 1942; 84 years ago
- Dissolved: 1944; 82 years ago
- Headquarters: Töölö, Helsinki
- Newspaper: Kustaa Vaasa, Uusi Eurooppa
- Ideology: Nazism
- Political position: Far-right

The Blue Cross (Finnish: Siniristi) was a Finnish Nazi organization active from 1942 to 1944.

== History ==
In 1939, a publication called Kustaa Vaasa began to appear. The Blue Cross Association formed around the magazine in 1942. Behind the founding of the association were Gunnar von Hertzen, Erkki Räikkönen and Martti Mustakallio.

The organization was supported by the New Europe magazine, which was published between 1942 and 1944. The organization also provided its members with the membership magazine also called Blue Cross, which covered political events at the time. Toivo Karanko was the editor-in-chief of the magazine.

The magazine should not be confused with a political publication of the same name published between 1933 and 1939. Provost Matti Jaakkola wrote for the member magazine.

During its activity, the Blue Cross published a few books, the best known of which is a reprint of the book The Protocols of the Elders of Zion.

The organization had an office in Helsinki at Museokatu 17 a 1. The board of the Blue Cross was chaired by Erkki Räikkönen and the other board members were Gunnar Lindqvist and Olavi Linnove. In the spring of 1944, the association announced that it had 12,000 members.

The organization was dissolved by the decision of the government in the autumn of 1944, as Article 21 of the Moscow Armistice required Finland to abolish all “fascist” organizations. The Blue Cross was one of the organizations that the Urho Castrén government abolished as soon as possible on September 23, immediately after the peace treaty came into force.

=== Publications ===
- Olavi Linnove: Euroopan Etuvartio (European Outpost), 1942.
- S. Nilus: Siionin viisaitten pöytäkirjat (Protocols of the Elders of Zion), 1943.
- Suomen puolesta Saksan kanssa. (On behalf of Finland with Germany), 1944.
