= Kustaa Vaasa (magazine) =

Finnish political magazine

- '
- Type: Magazine
- Editor-in-chief: Erkki Räikkönen
- Founded: 1939; 87 years ago
- Ceased publication: 1943; 83 years ago
- Political alignment: Nazism
- Language: Finnish language
- Country: Finland

Kustaa Vaasa was a political magazine in Finland. Behind the publication of the journal were Gunnar von Hertzen, Erkki Räikkönen and Martti Mustakallio. The journal was in Finnish language and idolized Nazism. The editor-in-chief of the magazine was Erkki Räikkönen throughout its publication. Contributors included Bertel Gripenberg, Matti Jaakkola, Gunnar Lindqvist and Olavi Linnove. The Blue Cross formed around the magazine.

Kustaa Vaasa was named after Gustav Vasa, king of Sweden from 1523 to 1560. Kustaa Vaasa was formed with the intent of unifying all non-socialists in Finland, and had relatively civil tone, compared to aggressive and virulent antisemitism of the Siniristi. Kustaa Vaasa wanted to form a "white front", harkening back to the days of the civil war, when "Whites" worked across party lines to defeat the socialists. However, despite the reconciliatory tone, overtures to the conservatives and strong anti-socialism, Kustaa Vaasa described itself as openly "National Socialist" and maintained active contacts with the German Nazis. Räikkönen also traveled in 1940 to German-occupied Norway where he met Franz Walther Stahlecker, leader of the Sicherheitspolizei and the Sicherheitsdienst. Kustaa Vaasa also advocated Finnish irredentism, Greater Finland and pan-Finno-Ugrism (Finnish: Heimoaate).

Despite being comparatively restrained when compared to Siniristi and Työrintama that pushed for a "final solution" to the Jewish Question, the magazine still advocated for "purifying the country of jewish merchantilism" and making citizenship dependent on racial-biological statement by "experts". Lindqvist wrote in Kustaa Vaasa how the local Jewish people had pushed England and the United States to side with the Soviet Union: "From behind the satanic, cold and calculated plot steps out the Judas' face of global political Judaism and the jingle of the traitors' bloody silver coins carries over the oceans."
