= Hjalmar von Bonsdorff =

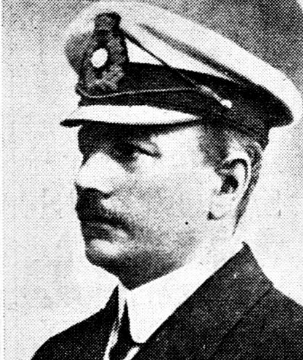

Hjalmar von Bonsdorff (26 November 1869 in Helsinki, Finland – 5 April 1945 in Stockholm, Sweden) was a Finnish admiral.

Von Bonsdorff's parents were Captain Victor Emil von Bonsdorff and Louise Adelaide Munck. Von Bonsdorff, trained as a naval officer in Saint Petersburg, served in the Imperial Russian Navy from 1891 to 1898. After joining the Finnish Maritime Administration, he was the head of its nautical chart department from 1899 to 1904. He participated in the Russo-Japanese War from 1904 to 1905 as a commander. After that, von Bonsdorff returned to Finland, where he was the head of the Oulu pilotage district and a lieutenant colonel in the Finnish Maritime Administration from 1908 to 1910. After the beginning of the First World War in 1914 he was called back to service and promoted to captain. Among other things, he was responsible for the coastal defense of the mouths and capes of the Danube in the Black Sea.

After Finland gained its independence, von Bonsdorff was admitted to the Finnish White Army as a colonel. During the Finnish Civil War, he was the Chief of Staff of the Mikkeli White Guard and the Chief of the Savo Front. In the spring of 1918, he was appointed military governor of Åland and acting governor and made the decision to detain Lev Kamenev, a Soviet Russian leader who was returning from France. He was tasked with crushing the separatist aspirations of the Ålanders. He received the rank of major general in the same year. In 1919 von Bonsdorff was for some time the Chief of Staff of the Finnish Navy and from March to July the Acting Chief of the Navy. He resigned the same year he received the rank of rear admiral. After that, he mainly focused on running the Söderkulla mansion, which he owned in Sipoo. During the Winter and Continuation Wars, he performed special duties from the commander-in-chief, such as awarding honors to the wounded in hospitals.

Von Bonsdorff was known as an open antisemite and fanatical supporter of Nazism. He was a founding member of the Patriotic People's Movement in 1932 and was also a member of the Nazi Finnish People's Organisation and for a short time was the editor-in-chief of the Nazi newspaper "For Freedom and Justice" (För frihet och rätt). He was the chairman of the Nazi organization for Swedish speaking Finns, "People's Community Society" (Samfundet Folkgemenskap). At the end of the Continuation War, he fled to Sweden in September 1944 and died there the following spring.

Söderkulla in Sipoo has streets named in honor of von Bonsdorff: Amiraalintie and Amiraalinkuja.
