= Unto Parvilahti =

Finnish Nazi SS member (1907–1970)

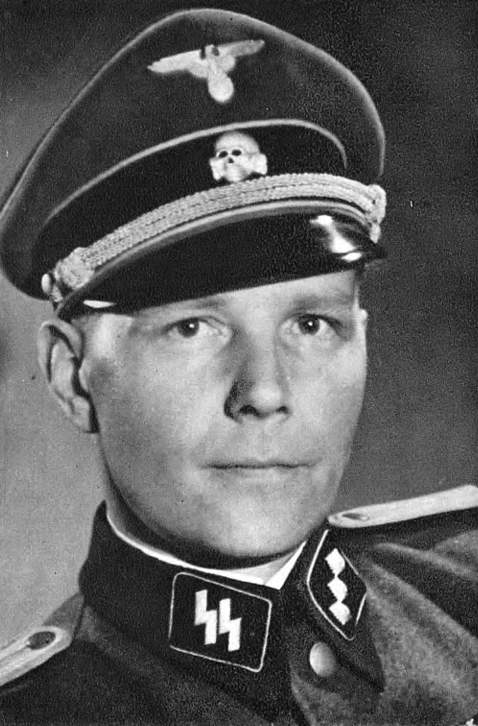
- Parvilahti dressed in the rank of Untersturmführer
- Born: Unto Ilmari Boman; 28 September 1907; Maaria, Grand Duchy of Finland, Russian Empire
- Died: 27 October 1970 (aged 63); Málaga, Spanish State
- Children: 1
- Military career
- Branch: Waffen-SS (SS Division Wiking)
- Active: 1930s-1944
- Rank: Untersturmführer
- Unit: Finnish Volunteer Battalion
- Conflicts: Mäntsälä rebellion; Winter War; Operation Barbarossa
- Awards: Iron Cross

Unto Ilmari Parvilahti (until 1944 Boman; September 28, 1907 Maaria – October 27, 1970 Málaga, Francoist Spain) was a Finnish photographer and businessman who served from 1941 to 1944 as the head of the liaison office of the volunteer Finnish SS battalion in Berlin. After being handed over to the Soviet Union among the so-called Leino's prisoners in 1945, he spent several years there in prison camps. After returning to Finland, he wrote the memoir Beria's Gardens (1957), in which he describes Soviet prisons based on his own experiences. He was an ardent supporter of Nazism.

== Life ==
=== Youth ===
Unto Boman's parents were bricklayer August Boman and Augusta Elina Träskman (formerly Rangell). He was the youngest of four children. His father was reportedly a former Red Guard member who was considered a communist in the 1920s. Boman left home soon after finishing public school and moved from Turku to Helsinki in 1924, where he initially worked in various temporary jobs, but gradually turned to photography. Boman completed military service in the procurement office of the Finnish military port and was discharged as a chief mate. He reportedly participated in the Mäntsälä rebellion in 1932. The Central Police watched Boman closely from the early 1930s and initially suspected him of being a Communist because of his father's background. In reality, Boman was already involved in the activities of Captain Arvi Kalsta's Nazi Finnish People's Organisation (FFO).

In the Winter War, he served in Flight Squadron 36. In October 1940, Boman participated in the founding meeting of the Swedish-language National Socialist organization People's Community Society, and was elected a deputy member of its executive board. The organization's secretary and key person was his friend, Jaeger lieutenant and prominent Finnish National Socialist Gunnar Lindqvist.

=== SS career ===
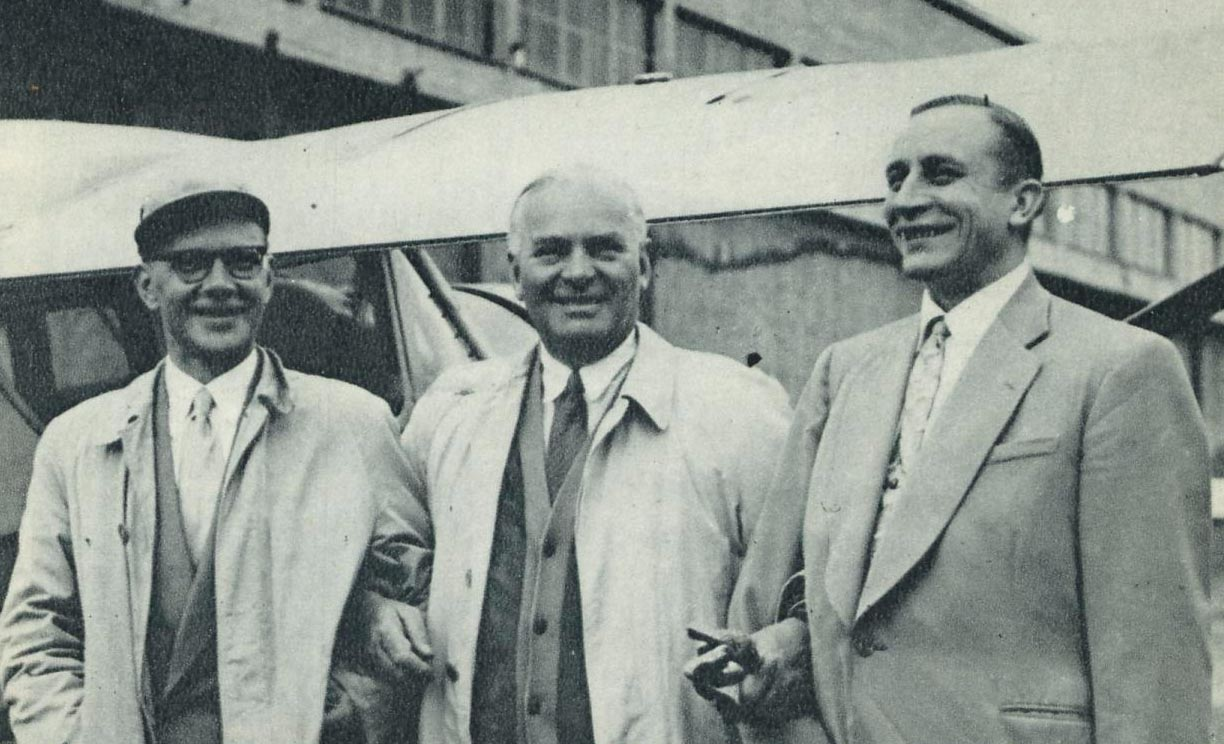
Parvilahti was active in promoting the interests of SS volunteers even after his imprisonment. In the photo, from the right, Aarne Roiha, General Felix Steiner and Parvilahti at Malmi Airport in August 1956.

In the spring of 1941, Boman joined the Finnish Waffen-SS volunteer battalion, to which Lindqvist recruited him. In his memoirs, Boman said that he heard about the recruitment of volunteers in March 1941 at a meeting of the FFO and that he was immediately eager to go. At the age of 33, Boman was one of the oldest Finnish SS volunteers. His enlistment was not hindered by the fact that, according to his military card, in 1927 he had been offered exemption from military service due to bone infection in his left ankle. He was one of the four hundred so-called "men of the division", who, due to their previous war experience, were placed in small groups in the SS Division Wiking already in the attack phase of summer 1941, while the majority of Finnish volunteers were still in training.

Boman participated in the battles of the German Eastern Front in Ukraine in June–July 1941. When investigating the possible role of Finnish SS men in killing Jews outside the battles, Boman's name has also come up. He is said to have burned down one synagogue, possibly in early July in or near the village of Ozerna near Tarnopol, around the same time as the Germans massacred the village's Jewish residents. According to one source, Boman would also have photographed the executions carried out by the Germans. Historian Lars Westerlund believes Boman probably participated in the atrocities, although there is no definite information about this.

Boman was wounded by shrapnel in the ankle between Smela and Dnepropetrovsk while serving in a reconnaissance team. On July 25, 1941, at the initiative of joint officer Ensio Pihkala, Boman was transferred to Berlin to take care of Finnish volunteers' affairs, above all postal connections to Finland. Boman received the Iron Cross Second Class for his military merits before being wounded, which was not awarded to him until the summer of 1944.

The liaison office of the Finnish SS battalion was formed around Boman in Berlin. Through the liaison office recognized by the Germans (Verbindungstelle des Finnischen Freiwilligen-bataillons der Waffen-SS), the Finns were able to influence the volunteers' affairs through the Finnish military representatives in Germany, Colonel Walter Horn and Commander Captain Hakon Grönholm, and through diplomatic channels. Boman handled, among other things, mail delivery and holiday and entertainment matters for Finnish volunteers under the title of Verbindugsführer der Waffen-SS zur Finnischen Gesandschaft. In November 1942, Boman received the rank of Untersturmführer in the SS, equivalent to second lieutenant, although his highest military rank in the Finnish army had been sergeant.

Even after the repatriation of the Finnish battalion in the summer of 1943, Boman remained in Germany to take care of the affairs of the wounded Finns and did not return to Finland until 1944. He was in contact with Alarich Bross, who built a secret intelligence organization in Finland and later the Pro-German resistance movement in Finland.

=== In captivity ===
Boman was one of eight Finnish citizens considered dangerously pro-German, who were immediately captured by the secret police after Finland severed its relationship with Germany on September 2, 1944. His name was the first on the list, and he was immediately detained from his home in Helsinki's Töölö. The other seven were released to house arrest after a couple of weeks, but Boman had to remain in protective custody for the time being. His pending name change to Parvilahti was realized shortly after his imprisonment during September. Detective Aarne Kauhanen, known as an extreme rightist, was in charge of his interrogations and house searches, who fled Finland a couple of weeks later. During the interrogations, he also defended himself by invoking the SS man's loyalty oath, which obliged him to be loyal to Adolf Hitler.

In April 1945, Interior Minister Yrjö Leino handed Parvilahti, who was still imprisoned, among the so-called Leino prisoners, to the Allied Control Commission. Parvilahti was an exceptional case among the twenty handed over, as most were Russian emigrants and only two native Finnish citizens. The Supervisory Commission immediately transferred the prisoners across the border to the Soviet Union. Parvilahti was accused of spying against the Soviet Union. During the spring and summer of 1945, the NKVD interrogated him alternately in the Lubyanka and Lefortovo prisons in Moscow, and from the end of August in the Butyrka prison. In December 1945, he was sentenced to five years in a prison camp under Article 58 of the Soviet Criminal Code. The crime was "helping the international bourgeoisie in the fight against communism". The Soviet authorities' suspicions of espionage were apparently not unfounded, but in the justifications for the sentence Parvilahti's possible crimes were in any case greatly exaggerated and it was alleged that he was guilty of murder.

During his imprisonment, Parvilahti learned the Russian language, knew how to behave during interrogations and was able to adapt well to prison activities. This all helped him to survive. He spent the first two years of his sentence in the Temnikov forced labor camp, from where he was transferred in 1947 to solitary confinement in the Vladimir prison. The conditions in the prison were better than the camp and the transfer could have saved his life. The five-year sentence was completed in April 1950, but Parvilahti was not allowed to return to Finland, but was deported to Siberia, to Dudinka, located in the middle of the tundra on the Taimyr Peninsula. There he worked, among other things, as a sawmill worker. Thanks to the mass amnesties that followed Stalin's death, the deportation was canceled in the summer of 1954, but leaving the country was not arranged immediately. Parvilahti spent the autumn in Moscow and Petrozavodsk. He was able to return to Finland on December 12, 1954. Parvilahti and German-born Richard Dahm, who returned at the same time, were the first of Leino's prisoners to return to Finland. Nine others returned over the next two years.

=== As a writer ===
Parvilahti wrote two memoirs, of which Beria's Gardens (1957) describes the conditions and events during his imprisonment in the Soviet Union. To Terek and Back (1958) tells about the phases of the Finnish Waffen-SS volunteer battalion. Beria's Gardens was the first work published in Finland that brought the conditions of the Soviet Union's post-World War II prison camp system to the attention of the general public. Compared to the non-fiction literature available at the time, the work has been considered a rather illustrative presentation of the Gulag system. The estimate presented in the book about the size of the prison camp system during Stalin's time is admittedly exaggerated in the light of current knowledge, because according to Parvilahti, there would have been a total of more than 45 million prisoners and deportees. The work also included an open stance against communism, warnings about the threat of the Soviet Union, and claims about the dominant position of Jews in the Soviet Union.

After the book was published, Parvilahti became a sought-after guest at, among other things, the events of the National Coalition Party and war veterans. The book was translated in 1958 into Swedish, 1959 into English, 1960 into German and 1961 into Spanish. In Finland, it was printed in 11 editions.

Parvilahti's health had suffered during the prison camp years. Thanks to the income he received from state compensation and his books, he stopped working in Finland and moved to Spain in 1961. The security police continued to follow his activities, but did not find anything to note in the post-war period. Even in his later years, Parvilahti did not compromise on his war time worldview. He died in Spain in 1970 and is buried there.

Parvilahti was married three times during his life, twice after his time in the prison camp. The first two marriages ended in divorce. He had one son from his first marriage.

== Sources ==
- Jokipii, Mauno: Hitlerin Saksa ja sen vapaaehtoisliikkeet. Helsinki: Suomalaisen Kirjallisuuden Seura, 2002.
- Jokipii, Mauno: Panttipataljoona: suomalaisen SS-pataljoonan historia. 4. p.. Helsinki: Veljesapu, 2000. ISBN 952-90-7363-1.
- Stein, George H.: Waffen-SS. Gummerus, 2005 2.p. ISBN 951-20-6676-9.
- Swanström, André: Hakaristin ritarit – Suomalaiset SS-miehet, politiikka, uskonto ja sotarikokset. Jyväskylä: Atena, 2018. ISBN 978-952-300-449-8.
- Uola, Mikko: Parvilahti, Unto (1907 - 1970) Kansallisbiografia-verkkojulkaisu (maksullinen). 6.9.2001. Helsinki: Suomalaisen Kirjallisuuden Seura.
- Vettenniemi, Erkki: Unto Bomanin salattu elämä, s. 345–378 teoksessa Parvilahti, Unto: Berijan tarhat: Havaintoja ja muistikuvia Neuvostoliiton vuosilta 1945–1954, uusintapainos. Otava, Helsinki 2004.
