= Toivo Karanko =

Finnish translator

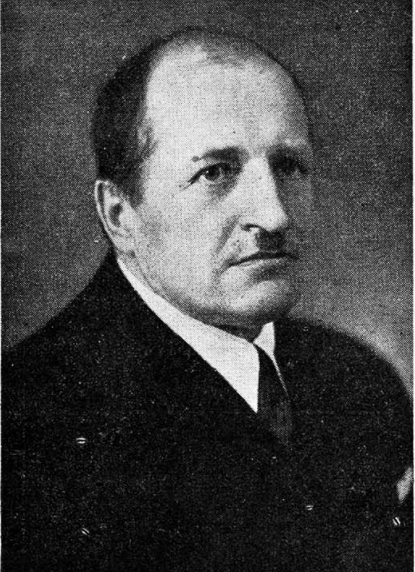
Toivo Karanko

Toivo Tuomas Savolainen, later Karanko (20 September 1891 Nurmes – 15 May 1969 Helsinki) was a Finnish Jäger captain and a journalist.

== Studies ==
Savolainen enrolled as a student at Nurmes Co-educational School in 1913 and joined the Karelian Association. He attended the Finnish Artillery School in 1918 and the Field Artillery Shooting School in 1923, as well as the refresher course for officers of the Defense Forces Officers' School in 1924. He continued his studies at the University of Helsinki in 1930.

== In Germany ==
Savolainen volunteered to join the 27th Jäger Battalion for training and military experience on 23 November 1915. He took part in the fighting in the First World War on the eastern front of Germany in the battles of Misse River, the Gulf of Riga and the Christmas Battles at river Aa. He also completed a special sabotage course in Polangen in 1917.

== Finnish Civil War ==
Savolainen arrived in Finland with the main group of Jägers, promoted to non-commissioned officer on 25 February 1918. He was assigned to the 2nd Jäger Battery and took part in battles in Länkipohja, Pitkäjärvi, Orivesi, Kangasala and Lempäälä and Tampere. In the reorganization of the artillery after the conquest of Tampere, he was placed as the division director in the 4th battery of the 2nd Jäger Battery of the newly formed Jäger Artillery Brigade and took part in the battles in Kämärä and Vyborg.

== Between the wars ==
Our faith and trust in the historical mission of the National Socialist Germany is unshakable. If it were to shake, then so would shake the foundation on which we stand, and we would deny the achievements and victories which we have fought with great sacrifices in loyal brotherhood-in-arms with the soldiers of the mighty German army.

— Toivo Karanko's editorial in Ajan Suunta

Karanko left the army in 1921 and became the chief of the Jyväskylä White Guard 8th district, until he returned to the service in 1922. He moved from Pielisjärvi to Jämsä in 1927, where he worked as a teacher of gymnastics and health education at Jämsä Co-educational School and Real High School until 1928. He later worked in the newspaper industry and was a journalist for the domestic news department at Helsingin Sanomat from 1929 to 1930. He next became a journalist for Ajan Sana ltd and joined the main committee of the Finno-Ugric Cultural Congress the following year. In 1932 he joined Publishing Company Vasara, a publishing company that published Nazi propaganda and antisemitic literature, and in 1934 he became editor-in-chief of Siniristi, a Nazi magazine.

Karanko translated Erich Ludendorff's book Threat of a World War on German Land and Martin Luther's book On the Jews and Their Lies. In the preface to Luther's book, he supported Luther's proposed actions against the Jews and considered the book's message particularly topical. Karanko also made a new translation of The Protocols of the Elders of Zion in 1943 which was published by Blue Cross.

== Winter and Continuation War ==
Karanko took part in the Winter War as the commander of the supply center of 4th Division. During the Continuation War he was inspector of the Prisoner of War Camps number 2 and 4.

== Family ==
His parents were primary school teacher, farmer Pekka Savolainen and Aina Maria Piironen. He was married in 1924 to Gerda Fredrika Magdalena Saxberg. Karanko was the stepfather of Ole Torvalds, who was the father of politician Nils Torvalds and the grandfather of software engineer Linus Torvalds famous for the Linux kernel.

== Awards ==
- Cross of Freedom 4th class with swords
- Medal of Freedom 2nd class
- Commemorative medal of the War of Freedom with clasp
- Commemorative medal of the Winter War
- Jäger medal
- German Honor Cross of the Participants of the Great War

== Sources ==
- Puolustusministeriön Sotahistoriallisen toimiston julkaisuja IV, Suomen jääkärien elämäkerrasto, WSOY Porvoo 1938.
- Sotatieteen Laitoksen Julkaisuja XIV, Suomen jääkärien elämäkerrasto 1975, Vaasa 1975 ISBN 951-99046-8-9.
