= Torsten Aminoff =

Finnish Nazi, journalist, genealogist and politician

Torsten Gregori Aminoff (27 August 1910 – 6 October 1985) was a Finnish journalist, genealogist and politician. He was a member of the Parliament of Finland from 1960 to 1962, representing the Swedish People's Party of Finland (SFP) and vice-chairman of the SFP central board. He was born in Tampere. He was an active member of the Nazi People's Community Society. From 1937 to 1941, he was the editor-in-chief of the weekly magazine Svensk Botten, from 1944 to 1945 of the afternoon tabloid Aftonposten, and from 1945 to 1960 of the magazine Appell. After that, he was the political editor of Hufvudstadsbladet until 1975. During the war, Aminoff was employed by the Government Information Center and the State Information Institute.
