= Harald Öhquist =

Finnish Jäger and Lieutenant General (1891–1971)

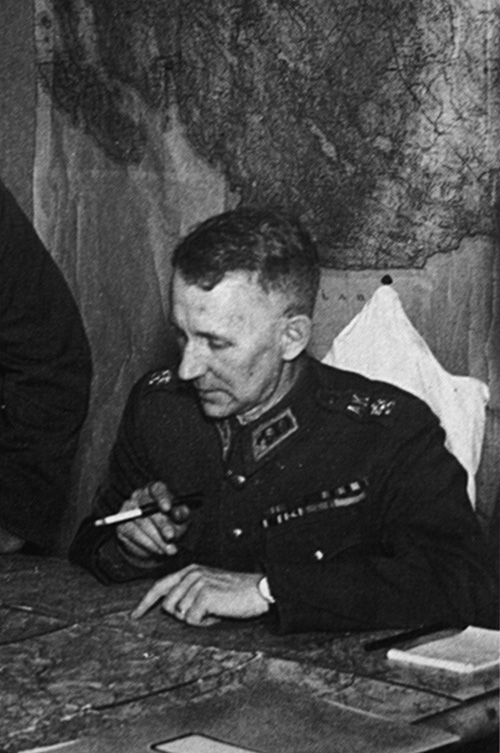
- Öhquist in 1941
- Born: 1 March 1891; Helsinki, Grand Duchy of Finland, Russian Empire
- Died: 10 February 1971 (aged 79); Helsinki, Finland
- Education: University of Helsinki
- Military career
- Allegiance: Finland
- Service years: 1915–1951
- Rank: Lieutenant General
- Commands: II Corps (Winter War)
- Conflicts: Finnish Civil War; World War II; Winter War; Continuation War

Harald Öhquist (1 March 1891 – 10 February 1971) was a Finland-Swedish Jäger and Lieutenant General who commanded the II Corps on the Karelian Isthmus during the Winter War of 1939–1940. A specialist on the defence of the Karelian Isthmus, he developed his own "battle doctrine for the Isthmus" between the wars and held senior commands there throughout both the Winter War and the Continuation War.

== Background and Jäger years ==
Öhquist was of Ingrian Finnish descent through his father, the writer Johannes Öhquist, and of German descent through his paternal grandmother. His father was a lecturer in German at the University of Helsinki and an activist writer who encouraged his son to go to Germany for military training. Öhquist completed a law degree at the University of Helsinki in 1914, making him one of the few Jägers who held an academic degree before the First World War.

He was among the first volunteers in the Jäger Movement. In mid-February 1915 he was already receiving and guiding new recruits in Berlin, and in early March he joined the so-called Pfadfinder course at Lockstedter Lager. He served and trained in the Royal Prussian 27th Jäger Battalion, was promoted to Oberzugführer in February 1916, and saw action on the Eastern Front. In early February 1918 he was assigned to lead the Jäger advance party sent to Finland, and later that month he established the volunteer 9th Savo-Karelian Jäger Battalion, which he commanded during the Battle of Vyborg.

== Finnish Civil War and Vyborg ==
During the Finnish Civil War Öhquist was promoted to Major and led his White Guard battalion at the Battle of Vyborg. He has been named in connection with the Vyborg massacre: orders for the executions were mainly given by officers of the Jäger Movement, and Öhquist reportedly admitted that his company had shot some 150 "Red Ruskies", though he did not state who had given the order. After the war, General Karl Fredrik Wilkama was considered responsible for the massacre, but neither he nor anyone else was ever convicted or charged in court; Wilkama himself described the massacre as a "little accident."

== Interwar career on the Karelian Isthmus ==
After 1918 Öhquist's main work lay in Karelia, successively as commander of the Karelian Guard Regiment, of the 2nd Division, and finally of the army corps designated as the covering force on the Isthmus. Known as "the lord of Viipuri Castle", he came to know the Karelian Isthmus thoroughly and over two decades developed his own "battle doctrine for the Isthmus". He was promoted to Major General in 1930 and to Lieutenant General in 1936, and also served in central national defence bodies, on the Defence Revision Commission in the 1920s and on the Defence Council in the 1930s.

== Winter War and Continuation War ==
During the Winter War of 1939–1940, Öhquist commanded the II Corps on the western Karelian Isthmus, the sector facing the main Soviet attack. The enemy's overwhelming numerical and material superiority prevented him from making full use of the defence plans he had developed in peacetime, and relations among the Finnish front commanders were not entirely free of friction; in particular, Öhquist had difficulty cooperating with his immediate superior, Hugo Österman, commander of the Army of the Karelian Isthmus.

At the beginning of the Continuation War he served as the Finnish liaison general at the headquarters of the German Army. In 1942 he was recalled to command the corps on the Karelian Isthmus, and in early 1944 he was transferred to General Headquarters as Inspector General of Military Training, a post he held until his retirement from active service in 1951.

== Later years and reception ==
In the summer of 1946, Öhquist's name was again raised when a new commander of the Finnish Defence Forces was being sought, but his candidacy fell when President Juho Kusti Paasikivi and Prime Minister Mauno Pekkala concluded that "Öhquist's nerves will not hold". Marshal Mannerheim likewise had no high opinion of Öhquist after the war and was critical of the honorary doctorate conferred on him by the University of Helsinki in 1950. After his retirement Öhquist worked for seven years in various civil-defence assignments in Helsinki.

The military historian Keijo Mikola has described Öhquist as exceptionally thorough in his working methods and rigidly straightforward and pedantic in his pursuit of fairness, but not among the most flexible or cooperative of officers.

== Works ==
- Öhqvist, Harald: Talvisota minun näkökulmastani [The Winter War from My Point of View]. 1949.
