= Arne Somersalo =

Finnish officer (1891–1941)

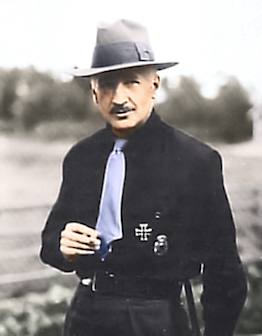
- Somersalo dressed in IKL party uniform. He is wearing the Iron Cross, awarded during his service in the Imperial German Army.

Commander of the Finnish Air Force
- In office 1920–1926
- Preceded by: Sixtus Hjelmmann
- Succeeded by: Väinö Vuori

Personal details
- Born: Arne Sakari Sommer; 18 March 1891 Tampere, Grand Duchy of Finland
- Died: 17 August 1941 (aged 50) Karelo-Finnish SSR, Soviet Union
- Cause of death: Killed in action
- Citizenship: Finnish
- Party: Lapua Movement, Patriotic People's Movement
- Education: University of Helsinki, University of Jena
- Occupation: Military officer
- Known for: Soldier, activist
- Awards: Order of the Cross of Liberty, Iron Cross 1st and 2nd class

Arne Sakari Somersalo (born Arne Sommer; 18 March 1891 – 17 August 1941) was a Finnish officer and anti-communist activist.

Somersalo was educated at the University of Helsinki before studying natural sciences at the University of Jena. Based in Germany during the First World War he enrolled in the German Army as an officer in 1916, serving until the armistice. He would later claim that the war had been the death of old Europe and argued that one of its main positives was that it had "rescued our nation from the deadly, slimy embrace of a lothsome cuttlefish" in reference to Russia. He transferred straight to the Finnish Army and from 1920 to 1926 was the commander of the Finnish Air Force.

He became involved in politics in 1926 when he started editing the right wing journal Valkoinen Vartio and then founded the fiercely anti-communist Finnish Defence League. He joined the Lapua Movement in 1930 then the Patriotic People's Movement (IKL) in 1932, serving as a delegate to the Parliament of Finland for the latter from 1933 to 1935 for Turku. He was also the editor-in-chief of the IKL party newspaper Ajan Suunta from 1931 to 1935. Ideologically he was a supporter of corporatism and was close to fascism. In 1934, Somersalo was arrested for making insulting statements against Estonian President Konstantin Päts. He was sentenced to four months in prison.

Recalled to active service for the Winter War, Somersalo acted as Chief of Staff for the frontline in Suomussalmi and was awarded the Order of the Cross of Liberty for his actions. During the Continuation War, he acted as a liaison officer for the German SS division Nord in Finnish Lapland. He was killed in action near Kiestinki (Kestenga), USSR on 17 August 1941.
