= Johannes Öhquist =

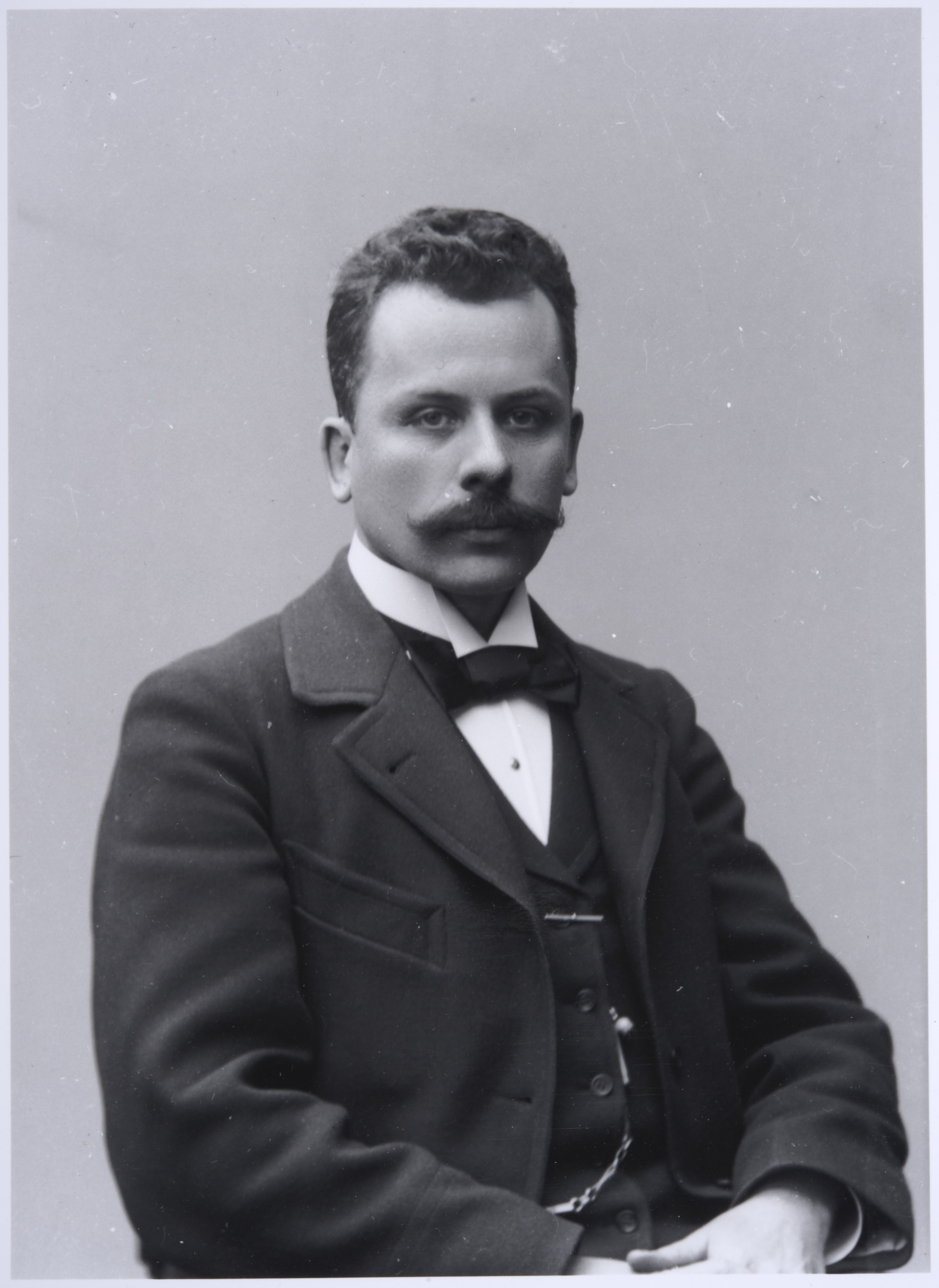
- Born: Johannes Wilhelm Öhquist; 6 December 1861; Venjoki, Russian Empire
- Died: 15 October 1949 (aged 87); Wolfach, West Germany
- Education: Saint Petersburg State University, University of Helsinki
- Occupations: Civil servant, language teacher, art historian, writer
- Parents: Kristoffer Öhqvist (father); Olga Maria Avenarius (mother)

Johannes Wilhelm Öhquist (6 December 1861 – 15 October 1949) was a Finnish civil servant, language teacher, art historian and politically active writer. He promoted cultural relations between Germany and Finland and disseminated information about Finland in German. He later sought to spread the idea of Nazism to Finland. Johannes Öhquist was the father of Lieutenant General Harald Öhquist.

== Career ==
Öhquist was born in Venjoki, Saint Petersburg Governorate, Russian Empire, to Provost Kristoffer Öhqvist and Olga Maria Avenarius, who had served as priest of Venjoki and later as pastor of St. Mary's Parish in St. Petersburg. His mother was of German descent, and German was also the mother tongue of Johannes Öhquist. He also attended school in German and also learned Swedish and Russian as well as moderate Finnish. Öhquist enrolled as a student at St. Petrischule in St. Petersburg in 1881 and studied law at the Saint Petersburg State University, 1884–1886 in Moscow, and then at the University of Helsinki in 1887. He served as the archivist of the Chancellery of the General-Governor of Finland in 1888–1910 and as a lecturer in German at the University of Helsinki 1895–1916. In addition, in the 1890s he taught German at several schools in Helsinki, including the Svenska normallyceum 1893–1894 and the Nya svenska läroverket 1895–1897. Öhquist published several textbooks and readers in the German language that remained in use for decades.

Öhquist knew several artists and cultural figures. As a literary and art critic, he took part in a debate on symbolism in Finland at the beginning of the 20th century. His work History of Finnish Art, published in 1912, was the first extensive presentation on its subject. Öhquist also tried his wings as a novelist and poet, but was only published three novels and a few poems in his lifetime. He was awarded the title of Professor in 1925.

During the years of oppression, Öhquist supported the activities of Finnish constitutionalists by, among other things, writing anti-Russian propaganda in foreign newspapers under pseudonyms. He had particularly extensive contacts with German and Austrian newspapers, publishers and celebrities. By 1918, he had published, edited, or translated about 20 German-language books on the Finnish question, some of them under the pseudonyms Wilhelm Habermann, Wilho Suomalainen, and Richard Schreiber. In addition, Öhquist published hundreds of articles on the subject and participated in the publication of Finnländische Rundschau between 1901 and 1902. As archivist at the Office of the Governor-General, Öhquist was also able to read secret police reports and was able to warn in advance those threatened with arrests or house searches. He was never discovered, and refused all the promotions offered to him in order to continue his activities. In 1910, he finally agreed to resign after receiving a big pension. During the First World War, Öhquist was a supporter of the Jäger Movement and from 1916 to 1918 worked for the Berlin office of Finnish activists (“Finnländisches Büro”).

After Finland's independence, Öhquist joined the Finnish Embassy in Berlin, where he initially worked as a clerk, from 1919 as a newspaper assistant and from 1921 to 1927 as a newspaper attaché. After retiring in 1927, he worked as a freelance writer. Even in his retirement years, he was a leading figure in German-language publishing in Finland and provided information on German conditions and literature to Finland and Finnish newspapers, respectively. After the rise of the Nazis in Germany in 1933, Öhquist quickly became a supporter and disseminator of the new ideology. In 1938, with the support of the German Ministry of Propaganda, he published a book The Third Reich: The Birth of National Socialism, Years of War, Worldview, and Society, which was also translated into Swedish and German. The German-language edition appeared in 1941 under the name Das Reich des Führers. From 1940, Öhquist lived permanently in Wolfach, Black Forest, Germany. He was involved in the activities of the Finnish Association, founded by Finns living in Berlin in the winter of 1944–1945.

Johannes Öhquist was married three times. He had two children from his first marriage, one of whom was Lieutenant General Harald Öhquist. Johannes Öhquist's brother was the author Alexander Öhquist.

Öhquist died in Wolfach, Baden, West Germany. Fenix-Kustannus has published a memoir From St. Petersburg to the Third Reich (2006), translated by Matti Liinamaa and based on Öhquist's manuscript.

== Chess ==
Johannes Öhquist was a founding member of the Helsinki Chess Club, founded in 1886, its vice-chairman from 1886 to 1892, chairman from 1892 to 1897 and from 1901 to 1906, and an honorary member from 1911. He was also Finland's first top player.

There is very little historical material about chess in 19th century Finland. However, it has been assumed that Öhquist became the leading player in the Helsinki Chess Club in the early days of the club. He did not have time to become a chess champion, as the title was established with the Finnish championship only in 1922. He was awarded the title of national puzzle champion in 1936 for making chess puzzles.

Öhquist's chess hegemony was sometimes broken in the 1890s by a young man named Anatol Tschepurnoff. In 1893, Öhquist still won the match against Tschepurnoff with 7 wins, 2 draws and 3 losses. There is no exact information on when Tschepurnoff became Finland's leading player. Anatol Tschepurnoff was then Finland's top player for more than three decades.

== Works ==
- Das Strafgesetz für das Großfürstentum Finnland (1891)
- Tysk elementarbok (1893)
- Tysk elementargrammatik (1893)
- Alfabetisk ordlista till Deutsche Prosa und Dichtung (1894)
- Tysk öfningsbok (1897)
- Der Pilger (1908)
- Albert Edelfelt (1910)
- Finnland und die öffentliche Meinung Europas (1910)
- Suonien taiteen historia (1910–1912)
- Das politische Leben Finnlands (1916)
- Finnland (1919)
- Leijonalippu (1922)
- Der kristallene Turm. Roman (1928)
- Samtida konst i Finland (1929)
- Schachprobleme (1932)
- Das dritte Reich (1938)
- Ein König und sein Günstling (1940)
- Das nordische Dreigestirn (1941)
- Das kämpfende Finnland (1944)
- Tysk språklära(1895)
- Kortfattad tysk grammatik. (1899)
