= Gunnar von Hertzen =

Finnish Jaeger officer and physician (1893–1973)

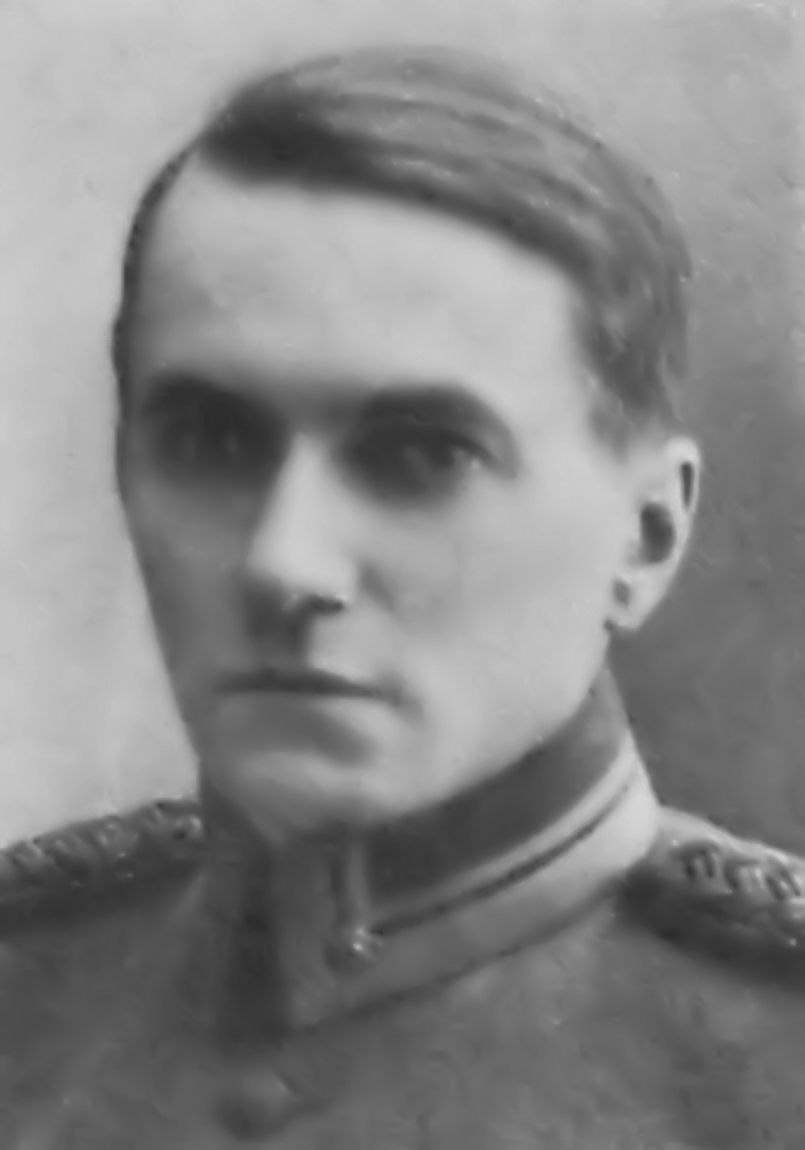

Gunnar Emil von Hertzen (11 March 1893 Halikko - 16 July 1973) was a Finnish Jaeger officer and the planner of the Aunus expedition (1919). He was a physician by profession and served as a physician during the Winter and Continuation Wars, becoming a lieutenant colonel in medical corps. He also took part in Nazi organisations in the 1930s and 1940s.

== Early life ==
Von Hertzen enrolled as a student at the Swedish Lyceum in Porvoo in 1911. He graduated with a bachelor's degree in medicine from the University of Helsinki in 1912 and a bachelor's degree in medicine in 1915 and a licentiate degree in medicine in 1927. He completed his medical studies in Austria and Hungary in 1928.

Von Hertzen became one of the first volunteers to join the Jäger Battalion on 3 March 1915. He took part in the fighting in the First World War on the eastern front of Germany in the battles of Misse River, the Gulf of Riga and the Christmas Battles at river Aa.

Von Hertzen arrived in Finland with the main group of Jägers, promoted to Senior Lieutenant on 25 February 1918. From 10 March 1918 he was sent to the Satakunta Front as the head of the ski troops. On 19 March 1918 Hertzen was appointed commander of the 1st Battalion of the Pori Regiment. In the Civil War, Hertsen took part in the battles on the Anttoora-Pastuskeri axis, Suodenniemi and Harjakangas. He was wounded in Suodenniemi on 17 March 1918, and in Harjakangas on 30 March 1918. His brother Karl von Hertzen fell on 13 March 1918 at the Battle of Anttoora.

== Aunus expedition ==
Von Hertzen personally led the southern main group's attack from Salmi through the town of Rajakonnu, Vitite, Tuulos and Alavoinen to the city of Aunus. The city of Oulu was occupied on 23 April 1919. After the conquest of the city of Oulu, von Hertzen concentrated his troops on the line of Märkiä and sent some of the troops to chase the enemy, and at that time they took over the villages of Sillankylä and Valkeajärvi, as well as the monastery of Alexander Svirsky.

Von Hertzen ordered a new offensive in early May after receiving reinforcements. The main battles of this attack again focused on the surroundings of Aunus and the subsequent defensive battle on the Tuulosjoki front. Von Hertzen himself was wounded in a bloody battle near the city of Aunus on 4 May 1919. On the last day of May, the thinning lines had been supplemented, and he launched a counterattack against the enemy now occupying the city of Aunus at night and drove the enemy out of the city, suffering great loss of life.

He placed his troops in defense on the Tuulos-Tenhunsel-Novinka line. In the meantime, the enemy had brought significant troops to the front, and von Hertzen had to fight against an ever-increasing enemy until, on 27 June 1919, the enemy made a surprise attack on land and sea, thus breaking Hertzen's defense. This broke the southern front of the expedition, and the expedition withdrew to Lake Säämäjärvi.

== Peacetime ==
Von Hertzen worked as an acting municipal doctor in Viitasaari from September 1928, but moved to Turku in 1931 as a general practitioner. After a short period in Turku, he moved to Pihtiputaa, where he started as a municipal doctor in May 1931 and held office until 1957, when he retired.

In the early 1930s, he was one of the founding members of openly antisemitic and Nazi publishing company Vasara. Later, in 1939, he co-founded Kustaa Vaasa magazine and the Nazi Blue Cross. Von Hertzen was a member of the delegation of the Lapua movement in 1930 and served as chairman of the board of its newspaper Ajan Suunta from 1930 to 1931, as well as a member of the staff of the Pihtipudas White Guard since 1933 and chairman of the Front Soldier League since 1934.

== Winter and Continuation War ==
Von Hertzen participated in the Winter War as the Chief Physician of the 18th Field Hospital. During the interwar period, he continued his civilian work in Pihtiputaa, and after the outbreak of the war, he was served as a district doctor to Aunus, who had become familiar with previous contacts and was important to him, where he worked under the East Karelian military regime.

== Awards ==
- Cross of Freedom 2nd class (two)
- Cross of Freedom 3rd class
- Cross of Freedom 4th class with swords.
- Order of the Lion of Finland 1st class
- Commemorative medal of the War of Freedom with clasp
- Commemorative medal of the Winter War
- Cross of Kinship War
- Commemorative medal of the War of Freedom of Aunus
- Jäger medal
- Prussian Iron Cross 2nd class
- German Honor Cross of the Participants of the Great War
- Merit cross of the Front Soldier League

== Sources ==
- Lauerma, Matti (1966). Kuninkaallinen Preussin Jääkäripataljoona 27: vaiheet ja vaikutus. Porvoo, Helsinki: WSOY.
- Lauerma, Matti, toim. Markku Onttonen ja Hilkka Vitikka (1984). Jääkärien tie. Porvoo, Helsinki, Juva: WSOY. ISBN 951-0-12588-1.
- Puolustusministeriön sotahistoriallinen toimisto (toimittanut) (1938). Suomen jääkärien elämäkerrasto. Porvoo, Helsinki: Werner Söderström Osakeyhtiö.
- Sotatieteen Laitoksen Julkaisuja XIV, Suomen jääkärien elämäkerrasto 1975, Vaasa 1975 ISBN 951-99046-8-9.
