= Vana-Roosa =

Village in Estonia

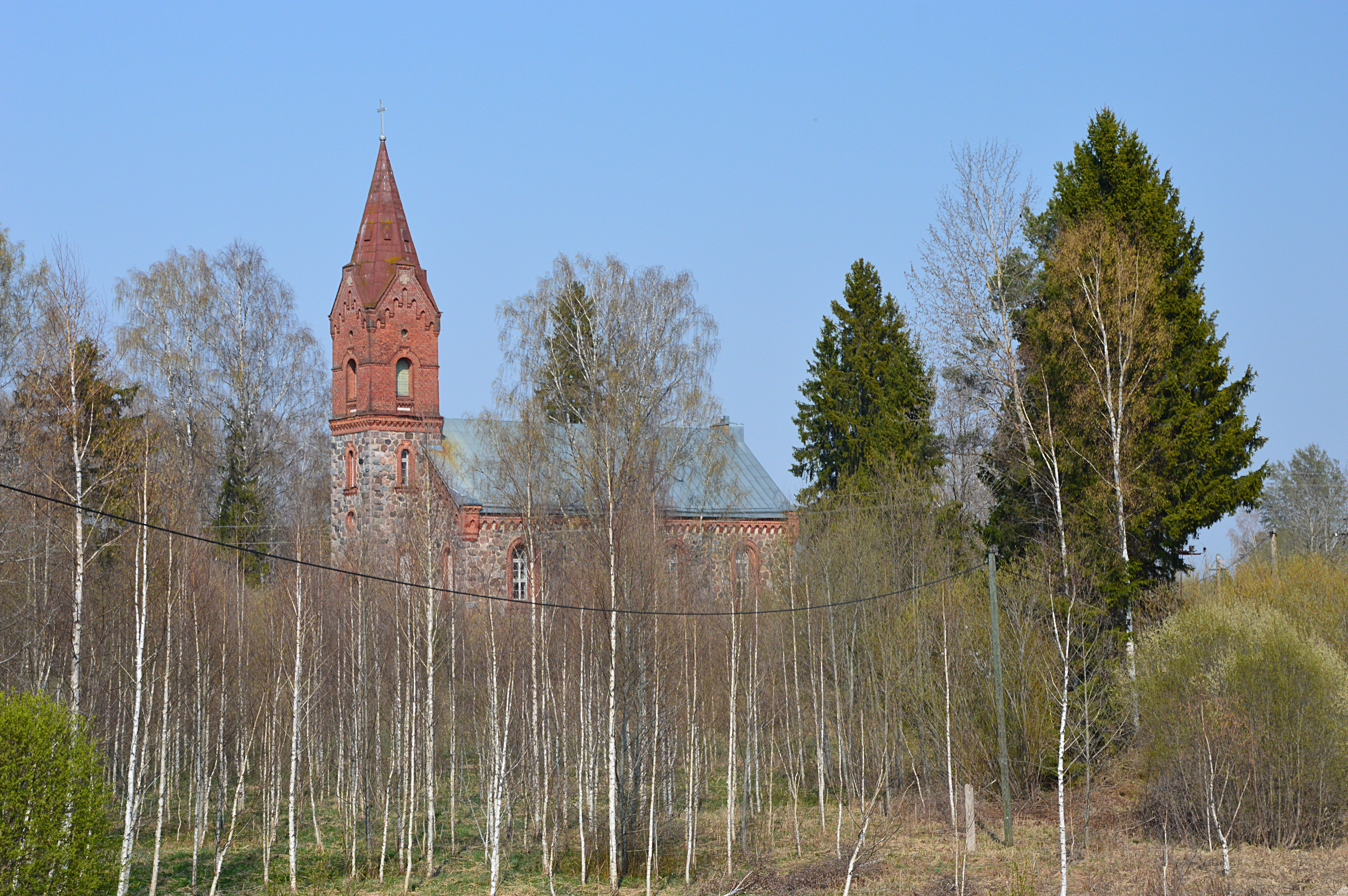

- Location within Estonia
- Coordinates: 57°40′17″N 26°40′21″E
- Country: Estonia
- County: Võru County
- Time zone: UTC+2 (EET)

Vana-Roosa is a settlement in Rõuge Parish, Võru County in southeastern Estonia. It contains a church, manor house and lake.

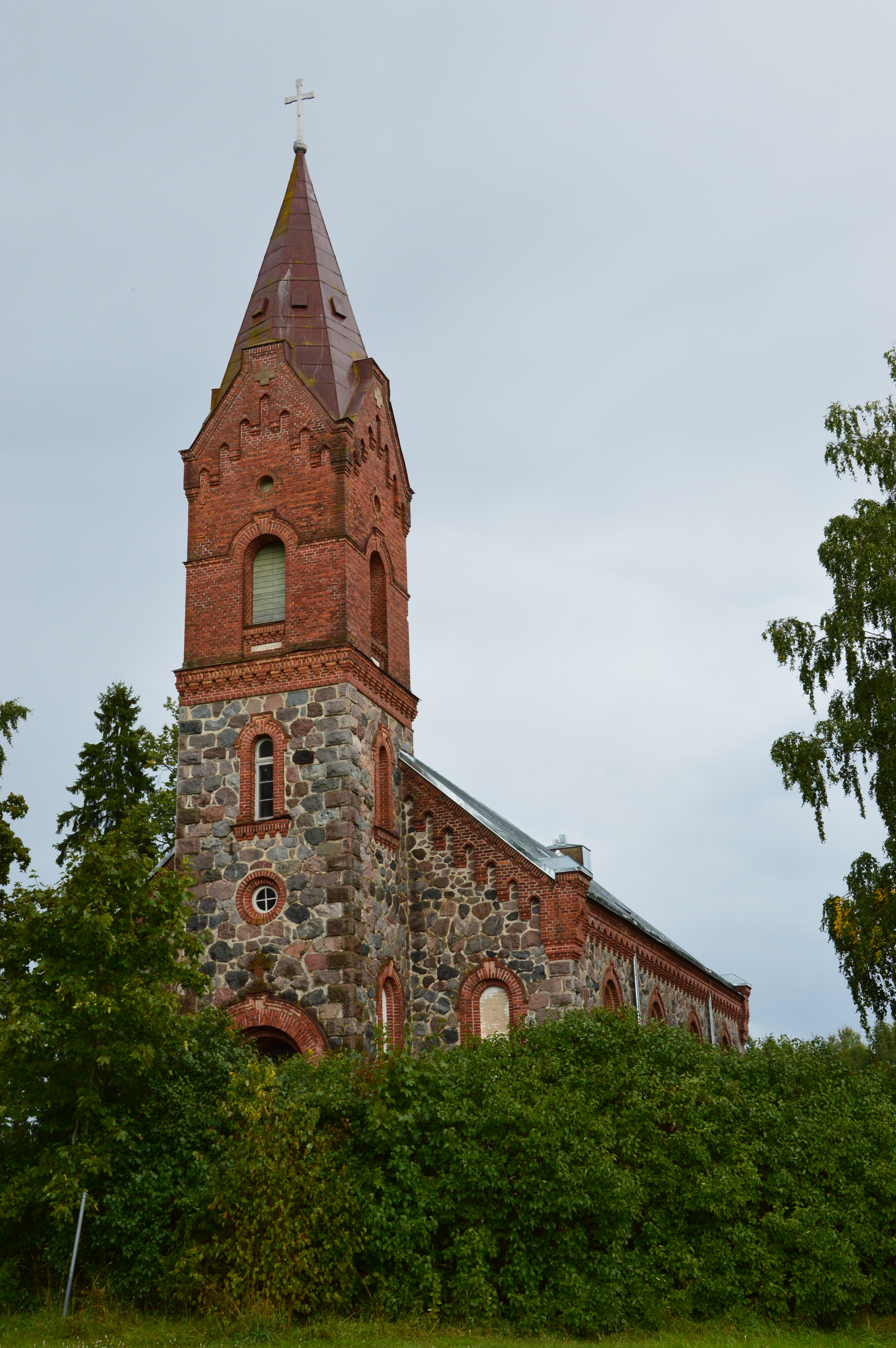
Roosa Jakobi church

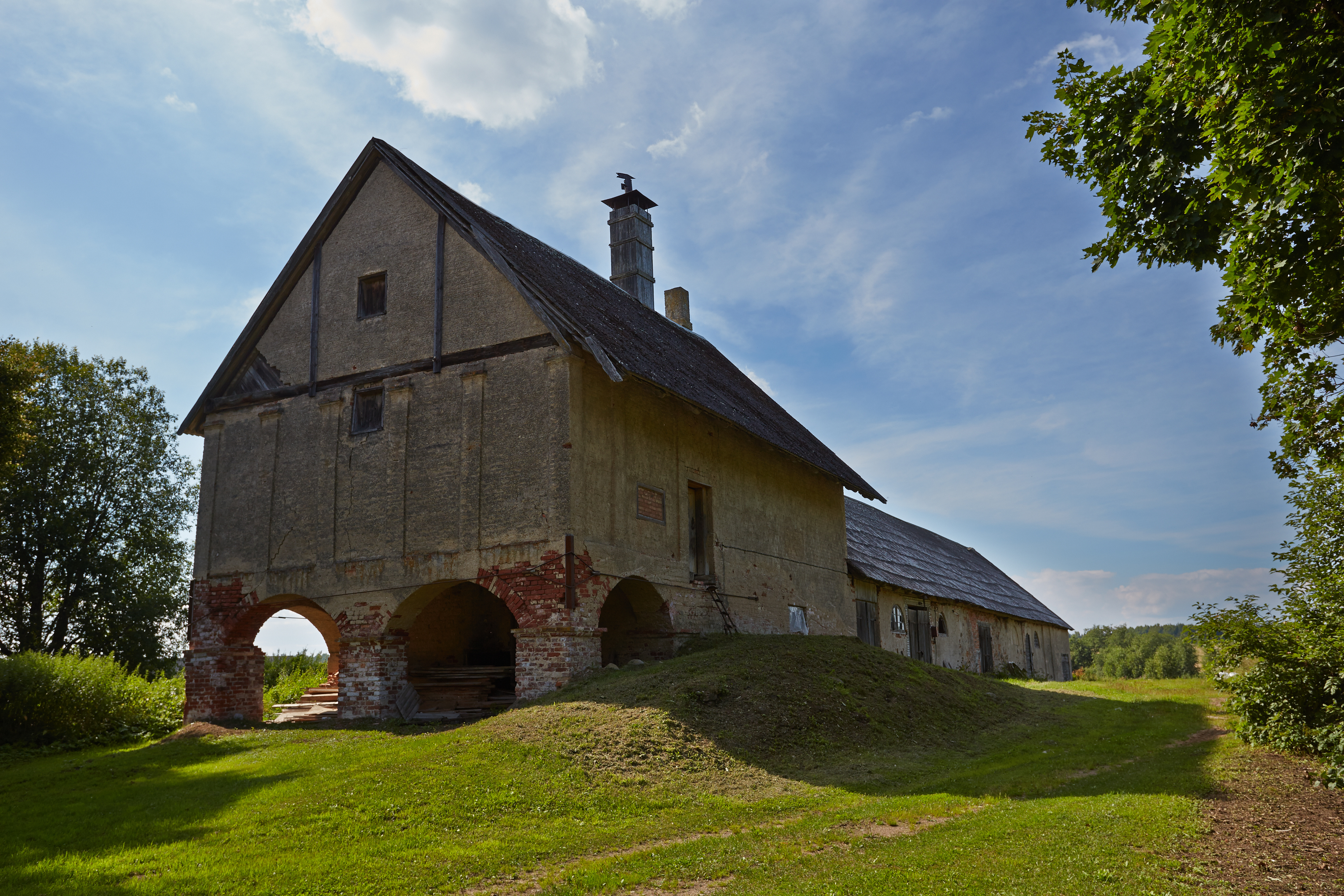
Vana-Roosa manor barn and granary

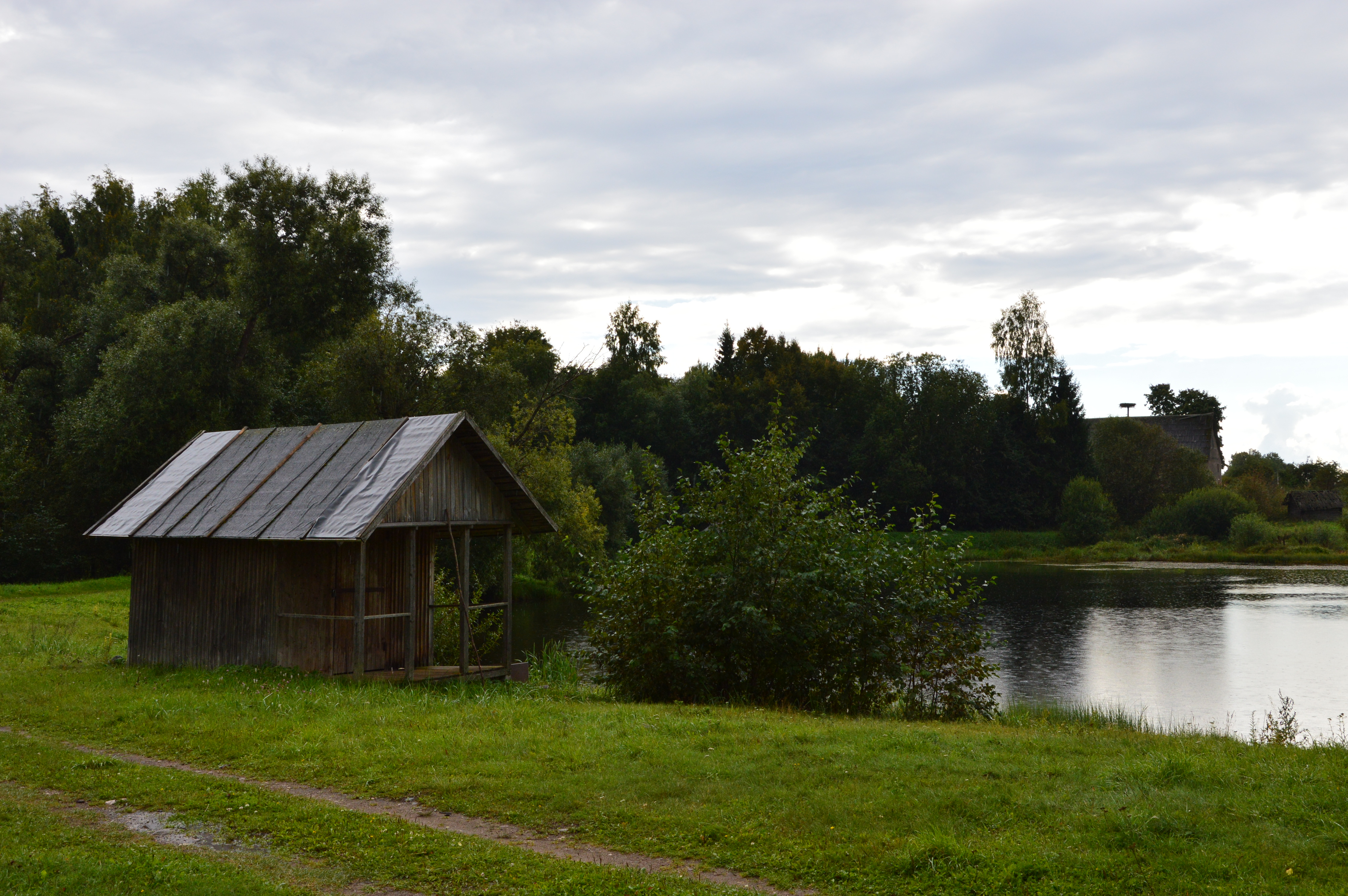
Vana-Roosa lake
