= Ajan Suunta =

Finnish newspaper

Ajan Suunta (Direction of Time)
- Cover of the newspaper, 30 June 1939: "Strike now for the Fatherland!"
- Type: Daily newspaper
- Format: Tabloid
- Editor-in-chief: Arne Somersalo (1932–1935); Rauno Kallia (1935–1939); Niilo Vapaavuori (1940–1944)
- Founded: 1932
- Ceased publication: 4 October 1944
- Political alignment: Patriotic People's Movement
- Language: Finnish language
- Country: Finland
- Circulation: +30,000

Ajan Suunta (Direction of Time) was the newspaper of the Finnish Patriotic People's Movement (IKL) that ran from 1932 to 1944. IKL published thirty newspapers and magazines, but the daily newspaper Ajan Suunta was the main organ of the party. Ajan Suunta was preceded by the newspaper Ajan Sana (Word of Time) published from 1930 to 1932.

== Content ==
Our faith and trust in the historical mission of the National Socialist Germany is unshakable. If it were to shake, then so would shake the foundation on which we stand, and we would deny the achievements and victories which we have fought with great sacrifices in loyal brotherhood-in-arms with the soldiers of the mighty German army.

— Toivo Karanko's editorial in Ajan Suunta

The newspaper was aggressive in its style, referring to itself as a "fighting journal", "weapon in the combat against un-Finnish forces". This was especially true under Arne Somersalo, when the magazine got in trouble with censors multiple times. Ajan Suunta was also deeply hostile to Jews, published antisemitic caricatures and connected Judaism to everything the IKL stood against like Marxism, freemasonry and liberalism. Ajan Suunta in general praised Hitler, taking the side of the Nazi government, blaming the antisemitic measures and the Night of Broken Glass on the "Jewish parasites", noting the restrain shown by the Nazis. Ajan Suunta would also frequently refer to and quote The Protocols of the Elders of Zion. Editor-in-chief Arne Somersalo even visited Hitler and Mussolini and gifted them Ostrobothnian knives.

In addition to strong antisemitism, Ajan Suunta was also anti-Swedish and anti-Russian. As the Jews in Finland mostly spoke either Russian or Swedish, the anti-Swedishness, Russophobia and antisemitism all complemented one another, leading Ajan Suunta to rail against "Swede-kikes" and "Russkie-loving Judeo-internationale". However, Ajan Suunta was not the most extreme newspaper published in Finland, for example the newspaper's competitors Hakaristi (Swastika) and Työrintama (Labor Front) continuously agitated for a "solution" to the Jewish Question, Työrintama publishing "humorous" cartoons of Jews digging their own graves. During the Continuation War the magazine reported ecstatically on the Finnish–German cooperation and brotherhood in arms.

== Bannings ==
Ajan Suunta consistently caused problems for the authorities and censors both home and abroad. As IKL was close allies with the Estonian Vaps Movement, Ajan Suunta published critical articles about Konstantin Päts' Estonia. For example, the following was published in 1933: "Estonia's government and center parties have sold themselves to the Marxists." As a response, Ajan Suunta was banned in Estonia for two years. On 22 December 1936, Ajan Suunta announced that 18 Estonian politicians, including ministers and leading politicians, had submitted a highly critical memorandum to Prime Minister Konstantin Päts. Päts responded that if the memorandum was to be published, he would imprison all 18.

The newspaper was finally banned for good after the Moscow Armistice in 1944, a week and a half after the party itself. Pavel Orlov, a political adviser to the Allied Control Commission, had demanded that the Finnish government shut down the magazine immediately, and the newspaper's board was contacted. The printing presses were stopped voluntarily after the government warned that otherwise there might be force measures against the entire Finnish press.

== Archives ==
- National Library digital archives of Ajan Suunta
