= People's Community Society =

People's Community Society Samfundet Folkgemenskap
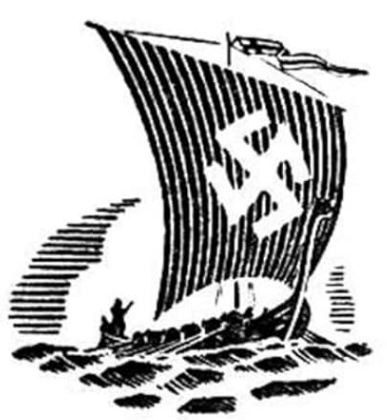
- Chairman: Hjalmar von Bonsdorff (1940–1942); Karl A. Jansson (1942–1944)
- Secretary: Gunnar Lindqvist
- Founded: 1940; 86 years ago
- Dissolved: 1944; 82 years ago
- Headquarters: Sipoo
- Newspaper: För Frihet och Rätt
- Ideology: Nazism
- Political position: Far-right

The People's Community Society (Samfundet Folkgemenskap, SF) was a Finland-Swedish Nazi organization from 1940 to 1944, founded at Söderkulla Manor in the autumn of 1940 in Söderkulla, Sipoo, Finland. Admiral Hjalmar von Bonsdorff was elected its first chairman and Lieutenant Gunnar Lindqvist its secretary. Sipoo was in the 1930-1940s a center of Finland-Swedish Nazism, as in addition to Bonsdorff, another central Finnish Nazi figure Thorvald Oljemark owned manor there. Unto Boman, among others, was present at the inaugural meeting, who in 1941–1944 served as a liaison to the Finnish Waffen-SS volunteer battalion in Berlin. According to him, the idea of forming a battalion was first presented at a meeting of the board of the SF. Other activists of the organization included Pehr Norrmén, an industrialist and banker who was also involved in the recruitment of SS volunteers in the spring of 1941, and Barons Bertil von Alfthan and Torsten Aminoff.

The aim of the SF was initially to spread the ideology of Nazism and knowledge of the "reorganization of Europe" under Nazi Germany, among the people, and eventually to create a strong Nazi party in the country.

Contrary to the mainstream of the Swedish movement, the group was ready to reduce Swedish to the local language, and to make Finnish the only official language in the country. The policy was based on the emphasis on Volksgemeinschaft emerging from the group's Nazi ideology. The group's language policy views were widely condemned in Finland-Swedish circles.

In addition to Bonsdorff, another leading figure of the organization was Lieutenant Gunnar Lindqvist, who was also the editor-in-chief of the "För Frihet och Rätt" magazine published by the organization. "För Frihet och Rätt" was funded by Petter Forsström. In the spring of 1942, Lieutenant Karl A. Jansson was elected the new chairman of the SF. It had close relations with other Finnish Nazi organisations, especially with the National Socialist Organisation led by Arvi Kalsta. The organization was dissolved by the decision of the Government in the autumn of 1944, as Article 21 of the Moscow Armistice required Finland to abolish all “fascist” organizations.

== Publications ==
- Folkgemenskap: tankar om en politisk reformation på den hävdvunna nordiska grudvalen av frihet och rätt, Samfundet Folkgemenskap, Vaasa, 1941.
