= Jäger Movement =

Finnish independence movement and volunteer military force, 1914–1918

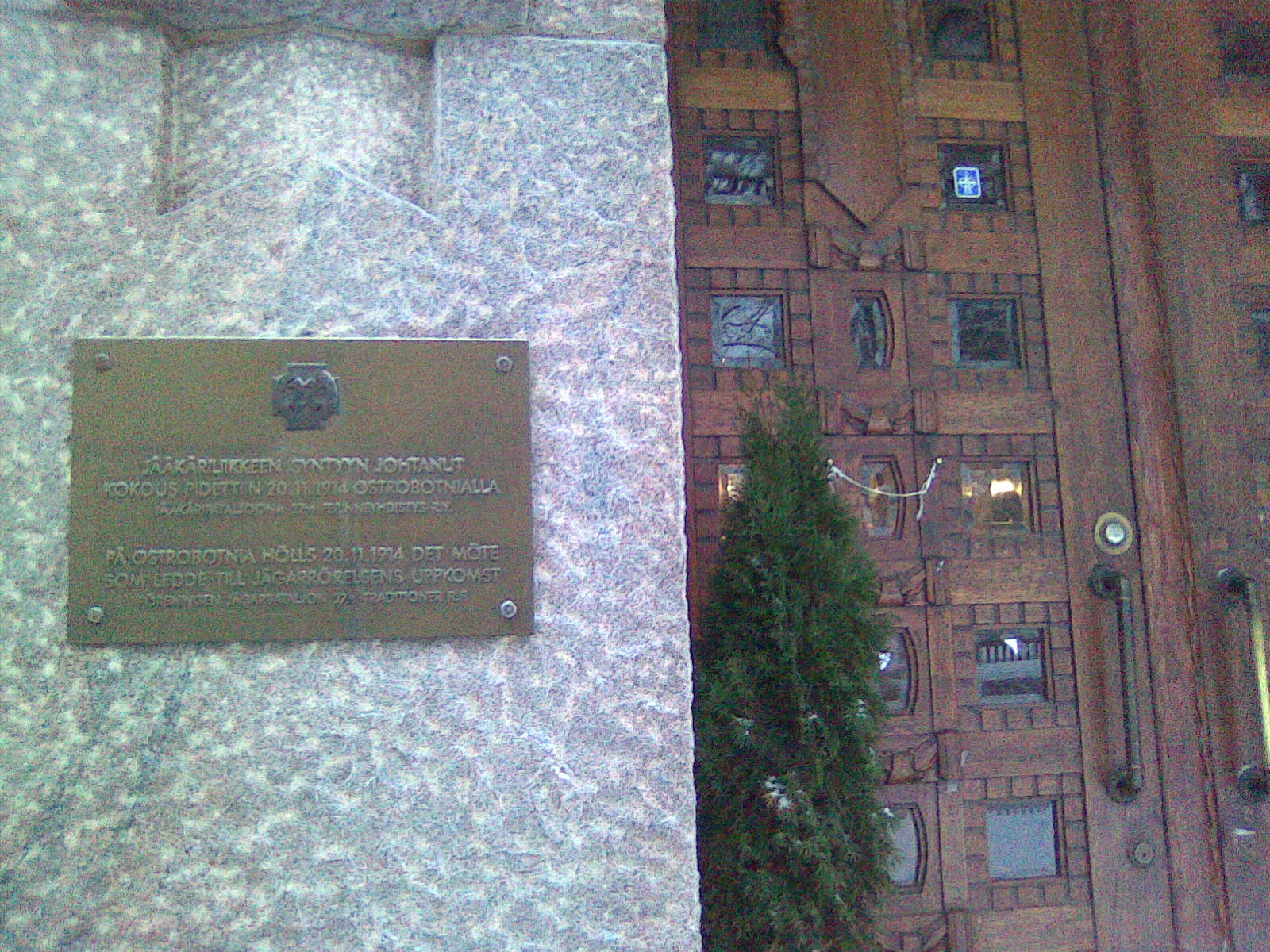
A plaque marking the birthplace (1914) of the Jäger Movement at the Ostrobothnia House in Helsinki.

The Jäger Movement (German: Jäger-Bewegung / Finnische Jäger, Finnish: Jääkäriliike, Swedish: Jägarrörelsen) was a Finnish political and military movement whose aim was to liberate the Grand Duchy of Finland from the Russian Empire and create an independent Finnish state. The movement grew out of the Finnish activist movement that had emerged during the periods of Russification. From 1915, a total of 1,894 Finnish volunteers received military training in Germany, and the soldiers came to play a central role in the Finnish Civil War of 1918.

== Background ==
The Russian manifesto of 17 November 1914, which outlined a comprehensive programme for the Russification of Finland, became the catalyst for the movement. On 20 November, curators of the student nations and other activists gathered for a secret meeting at the Ostrobothnia House in Helsinki, where plans for Finland's liberation from Russia began to take shape. Both Finnish- and Swedish-speaking students were represented, and the participants formed a central committee to lead the effort.

It was considered necessary to form a national army, but military training could not be obtained in Finland. Individual Finns attempted as early as 1914 to organise training in Sweden, but the Swedish government did not want to involve the country in World War I. In January 1915, however, Germany was prepared to train 200 Finnish recruits for future operations in their homeland. For Germany, this was a measure intended to weaken its enemy Russia.

== Training in Germany ==
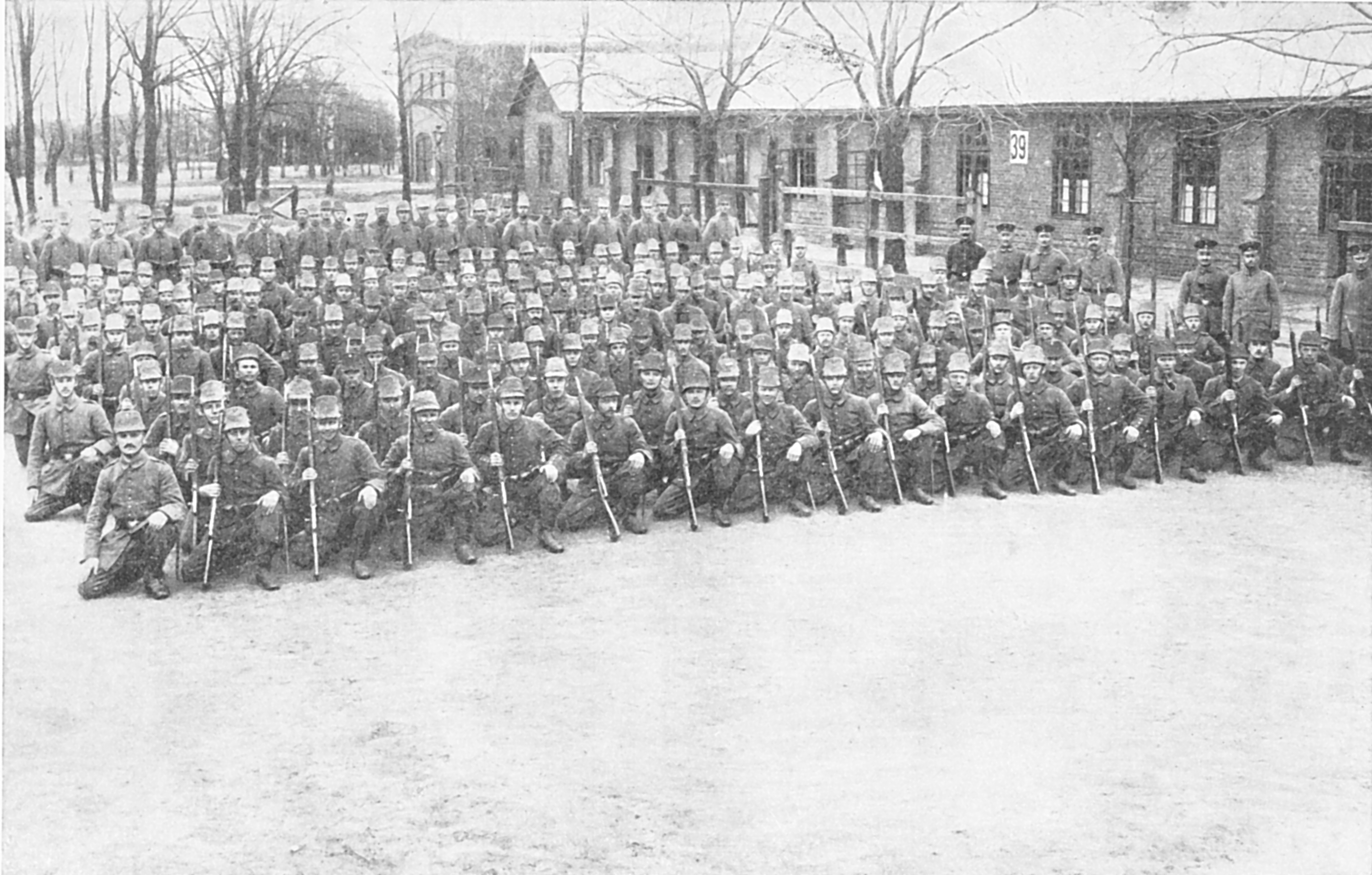
1st Company of the 27th Royal Prussian Jäger Battalion at Lockstedt camp, 1916.

The volunteers travelled secretly via Sweden through a clandestine network of safe houses to Germany, where they ostensibly took part in a scout leader course at Lockstedt camp (since 1956 Hohenlockstedt) near Itzehoe in Holstein.

The operation was directed by the intelligence service of the Imperial German Navy, while the training was carried out by the Royal Prussian Army. A central role was played by Fritz Wetterhoff, who from Berlin facilitated contacts between the Finnish activists and the German military leadership. New soldiers were secretly recruited throughout Finland, and a total of 1,894 Finns received training. Among them were approximately 500 students, an equal number of workers, and over 300 farmers; regionally, Ostrobothnia was the most strongly represented with 780 men, followed by Karelia with 234 and Uusimaa with 228.

In the spring of 1916, the unit was designated the Royal Prussian 27th Jäger Battalion under the command of Major Maximilian Bayer.

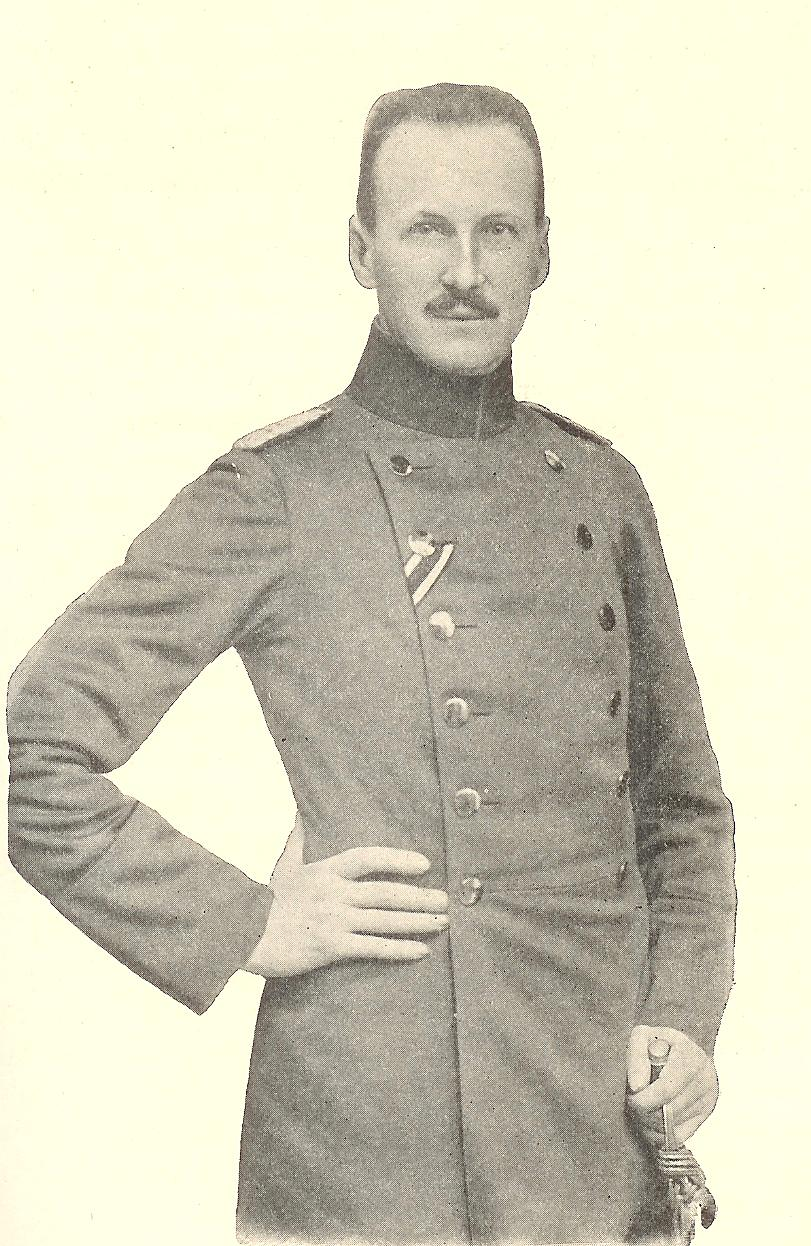
Major Maximilian Bayer, commander of the 27th Royal Prussian Jäger Battalion.

The movement's activities abroad were organised by docent Herman Gummerus, who led the Finnish foreign delegation in Stockholm from 1915 to 1918.

== Imprisoned Jägers ==
Russia learned of the Jäger battalion in the autumn of 1915 and a number of soldiers and supporters were arrested. The prisoners were taken to the Shpalernaya prison in Petrograd and came to be known as the "bar Jägers" (Finnish: kalterijääkärit). They were released following the February Revolution of 1917.

== Front service and return ==
Towards the end of the summer of 1916, the battalion was sent to a sector near the Gulf of Riga, where it was deployed in front-line service against Russia. The battalion was fairly soon withdrawn from the front and stationed in Libau, where it remained for more than a year.

On 6 December 1917, Finland declared its independence following the Bolshevik October Revolution in Russia. Independence was achieved without armed conflict, but in 1918 a civil war broke out. In early February 1918, an advance detachment under Harald Öhquist was sent to Finland, and the main force landed in Vaasa on 25 February 1918, where they were received by Gustaf Mannerheim.

== The Civil War ==
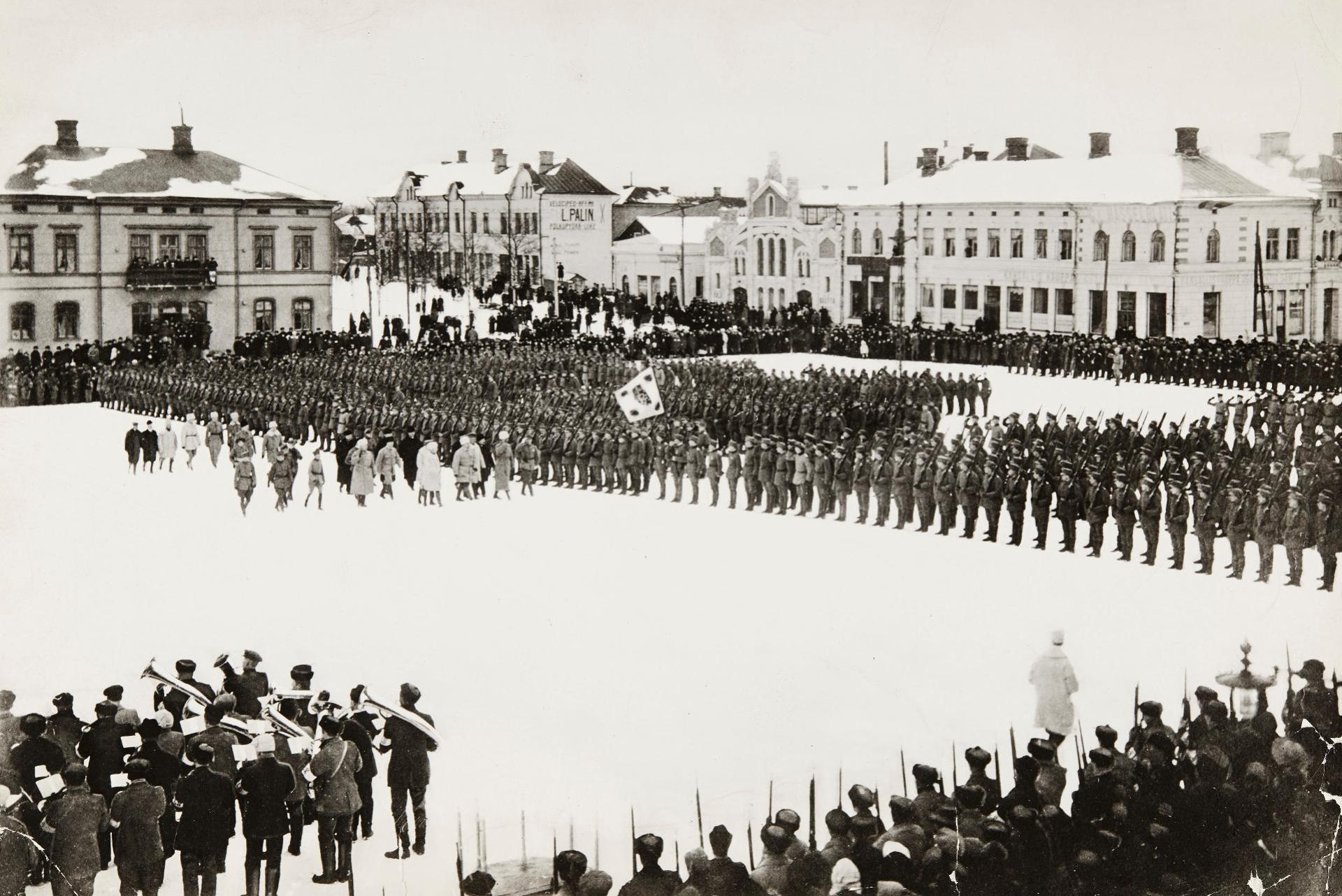
Finnish Jägers parading at the town square of Vaasa, 1918.

The soldiers formed the core of the White army. A conflict arose, however, known as the Jäger conflict, between the soldiers and the White army's commander-in-chief Gustaf Mannerheim, as well as other Finnish officers with Russian military backgrounds. The disagreement concerned how the Jäger battalion should be used; the conflict was resolved through mutual compromise. The soldiers went on to form the officer corps and training cadre of the new Finnish army.

A total of 1,261 soldiers took part in the civil war on the White side, of whom 128 were killed and 238 wounded.

== After the war ==
Not all Jägers fought in the 1918 war on the White side; some sympathised ideologically with the Reds due to their working-class backgrounds. A total of 441 Jägers returned to Finland only after the end of the civil war. Most returned to civilian life after the war, though some continued their military careers. Most participated in the Winter War and the Continuation War.

== Legacy ==
The Jäger Movement has been described as a unique phenomenon in Finnish history. Without the movement and the associated independence policy, the political developments in Finland in 1917 and 1918 that led to the country's independence would hardly have been possible.

== Timeline ==
- 17 November 1914 – The Great Russification Programme is published in the Finnish press.
- 20 November 1914 – Student activists gather at the Ostrobothnia House in Helsinki, founding the Jäger Movement.
- 25 February 1915 – The first group of volunteers arrives at Lockstedt camp in Germany.
- 26 August 1915 – Emperor Wilhelm II signs the decree establishing the battalion.
- 9 May 1916 – The unit is officially named the Royal Prussian 27th Jäger Battalion.
- Summer 1916 – The battalion is deployed to the Gulf of Riga sector.
- March 1917 – The battalion is transferred to reserve status in Libau.
- 6 December 1917 – Finland declares independence.
- 25 February 1918 – The main force arrives in Vaasa.

== Present day ==
Today, infantry in the Finnish Army are designated either as infantry or Jäger troops. The Jäger March, composed by Jean Sibelius to words by Jäger Heikki Nurmio, remains the honorary march of several army units.

== See also ==
- Russification of Finland
- Finnish activism
- Jäger (infantry)
- Finnish Civil War
