= Gunnar Lindqvist =

Finnish Jäger

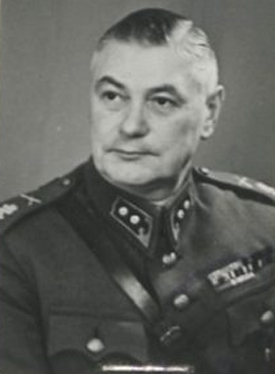
- Portrait of Lindqvist from an identity card, 1942
- Born: 13 December 1898; Helsinki, Grand Duchy of Finland, Russian Empire
- Died: 5 January 1973 (aged 74)
- Military career
- Rank: Senior lieutenant
- Wars: World War I; Finnish Civil War; Estonian War of Independence; Winter War; Continuation War
- Awards: Order of the German Eagle; Cross of Liberty (Estonia); Cross of Liberty (Finland)

Gunnar Isak Lindqvist (13 December 1898 in Helsinki – 5 January 1973) was a Finnish Jäger and a senior lieutenant in the Estonian Army. He had received military training during World War I as a Jäger and fought on the Eastern Front at the Misse River in 1916. Later, he took part in the Finnish Civil War in the White Army as a signals officer and in the Estonian War of Independence as a battalion commander. During his life, he served in the armies of three states and was a veteran of six wars. In the 1930s and 1940s, Lindqvist was active in several Nazi groups.

== Family ==
Lindqvist's parents were the translator and journalist Rafael Lindqvist and Olga Ivanoff. He was married for the first time in 1927 with Austra Wait and a second time with Hilja Helmi Toikander. Lindqvist attended the fifth grade in Normal Lyceum of Helsinki.

== In Germany ==
Lindqvist volunteered for military training in Germany in the 3rd Company of the 27th Jäger Battalion on 10 October 1915, from where he was transferred with 53 other men to the Battalion's Communication Department, established on 2 October 1917. He took part in the fighting in the First World War on the eastern front of Germany on the Misse River, the Gulf of Riga and the Aa River, where he was wounded on 7 January 1917.

== Finnish Civil War ==
Lindqvist entered the service of the Finnish Army, after being promoted to sergeant major in Germany on 11 February 1918, and arrived in Finland on 25 February 1918 with the main group of Jägers. He was enlisted in the Finnish White Army as a signal officer in the staff of the 2nd Jäger Brigade. He took part in the civil war battles in Vyborg.

== Estonian War of Independence ==
After the Civil War, Lindqvist served as a mission officer in the Division 2 headquarters. He resigned from the army on 22 October 1918, only to leave for the Estonian War of Independence. In January 1919, he joined the Finnish Battalion of the Armored Train Division of the Estonian Army, where he served as an adjutant of the battalion and later as a commander of the same battalion. He took part in the battles on the southern front in Mustjõgi, Menzen (Mõniste) and Rosenhof (Vana-Roosa), among others.

He resigned from the Estonian army in early June 1919 and then joined the Iron Division of Rüdiger von der Goltz in August of the same year in Mitau as a senior lieutenant. He first served as commander of the 2nd Company of the Battalion of Senior Lieutenant Boden and later as a weapon and messenger officer of the battalion. He took part in the battles in the Iron Division in Varkal, Pinkenhof, Annenhof and Kalnzeem, among others. He later moved to Stettin, where the troops were disbanded. After the division was disbanded, Lindqvist remained in Stettin and founded a brokerage there in 1920 and worked as its manager until 1927, when he returned to Finland and then worked as the manager of a forwarding company he founded in Helsinki until 1931. He later worked, among other things, from 1936 to 1938 as the branch manager of Automaattiteollisuus oy and from 1 May 1938 as the corresponding editor of För Frihet och Rätt until 1944.

== Winter and Continuation War ==
Lindqvist participated in the Winter War as a financial officer in the Replenishment Battalion and later as a maintenance manager at the Infantry Training Center 7. After the outbreak of the Continuation War, he was sent to the Helsinki Military County Staff as a maintenance officer, from where he was transferred to the Headquarters as an adjutant. From the headquarters, he was transferred to the headquarters of the Southwest Häme White Guard District as an assistant to the maintenance manager. In 1942 he was transferred to civil protection duties, being in office until the end of the war.

Lindqvist had been a major influence in Finnish Nazism since the 1930s and had good relations with Nazi German intelligence agencies. He was the secretary and de facto leader of the People's Community Society, a Swedish-speaking Nazi organization founded in the autumn of 1940. He was actively recruiting Finns for the volunteer Waffen-SS battalion. Lindqvist recruited at least 111 men, 54 of whom ended up in the battalion. The SS men he personally recruited included Unto Boman, Sakari Lappi-Seppälä and Lauri Törni. In 1942, Lindqvist was vice-president of the Blue Cross, a Nazi organisation. After Finland severed its alliance with Germany on 2 September 1944, Lindqvist was one of eight dangerous pro-German individuals immediately detained by the State Police. He was released after a couple of weeks on the condition that he would not leave Kärkölä. However, he fled during September with the intention of entering Germany, but was caught in Sweden and had to be interned there.

== After the wars ==
Lindqvist was interned in Sweden until 1946. From 1946 he worked as an accountant at the Umeå steam brewery until 1947, when he joined Umeåbladet as a journalist and held the position until 1948. From Umeåbladet, he joined Nord-Sverige magazine in Sollefteå and was a paid employee of the company until 1952, when he moved to Örnsköldsvik-Posten as editor-in-chief and held the position until 1956. In 1956, he moved to the Åland newspaper as editorial secretary, a position he held until 1962, when he became the PR man of Ålands Turistförening.

== Awards ==
- Cross of Freedom 4th class with swords (1918 and 1940)
- Commemorative medal of the War of Freedom with clasp
- Commemorative medal of the Winter War
- Commemorative medal of the War of Liberation of Karelia
- German Honor Cross of the Participants of the Great War
- Order of the German Eagle 3rd class
- Estonian Cross of Freedom 3rd class
- Commemorative medal of the Estonian War of Freedom
- Commemorative medal of the Latvian War of Freedom

== Sources ==
- Puolustusministeriön Sotahistoriallisen toimiston julkaisuja IV, Suomen jääkärien elämäkerrasto, WSOY Porvoo 1938.
- Sotatieteen Laitoksen Julkaisuja XIV, Suomen jääkärien elämäkerrasto 1975, Vaasa 1975 ISBN 951-99046-8-9.
- Suomalainen, Jaakko, Sundvall, Johannes, Olsoni, Emerik ja Jaatinen, Arno (toim.) (1933). Suomen jääkärit: toiminta sanoin ja kuvin II, 2. painos. Kuopio: Osakeyhtiö Sotakuvia.
