= Pehr Norrmén =

Finnish banker, journalist and author

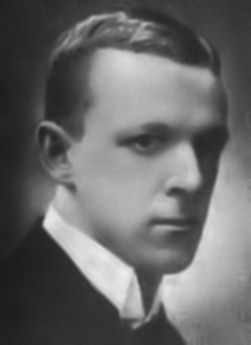
- Born: 22 April 1894; Helsinki, Grand Duchy of Finland
- Died: 1 April 1945 (aged 50); Stockholm, Sweden
- Education: University of Helsinki
- Occupations: Banker, journalist, author

Pehr Herman Norrmén (22 April 1894 – 1 April 1945) was a Swedish-speaking Finnish banker, journalist and author. He was one of the founders of the Jäger movement and was one of the most influential representatives of right-wing radicalism in Finland, with a distinctly pro-German political orientation.

== Biography ==
Born in Helsinki, Norrmén was the son of Herman Norrmén and Eva Victoria Molander. He graduated in 1913 from the University of Helsinki and was a member of the promotion committee there. In the summer of 1914 he went to England to collect material for his doctoral thesis, but he returned when World War I broke out. Norrmén belonged to the inner circle of young academics who in 1914 took the initiative for the Jäger movement and worked for it in Stockholm, Sweden, where he participated in negotiations with Swedes and Germans about military training for Finnish volunteers. He has been described as the first person to raise the question of armed struggle as the inevitable path to Finnish independence. In February 1915 he was one of the first Finnish volunteers to join the so-called Pfadfinder course for military training at Lockstedter Lager in Germany.

In April 1915 he was sent on a recruiting trip to the Finns in America. The trip was interrupted shortly after, and from the beginning of August 1915 Norrmén worked within the so-called Stockholm delegation for the Finnish freedom movement. His main task was drafting memoranda, political analyses and pamphlets. The most significant of these was the delegation's secret memorandum Die Nordischen Länder und die Mittelmächte, printed in Germany in 1916, which was one of the independence movement's most important documents. He was in contact with Swedish-speaking activists and contributed to their magazine Svensk Lösen. He returned to Finland in November 1917 and joined the White Guard in Helsinki.

From 1923 to 1926 he was an editorial writer for Hufvudstadsbladet, then in 1927 he was appointed CEO of the Employers' Association of Träförädlingsindustrierna i Finland. From 1931 he was a member of the board of directors of the Nordic Union Bank, and in 1939 he was appointed deputy CEO there. He also made himself known as a pioneer in industrial history.

Norrmén was one of the most influential figures in right-wing radicalism in Finland. In the 1920s he supported the strike-breaking activities led by Martti Pihkala in the organization Vientirauha and during the 1930s the anti-communist activities of the Lapua movement. In 1937 he founded, together with a few others, the right-wing weekly newspaper Svensk Botten. A notable detail of his political biography is his close friendship with his neighbour at Havsgatan 7 in Helsinki, the left-wing playwright and businesswoman Hella Wuolijoki; this politically unlikely pair spent the late 1930s pondering together Finland's possibilities of escaping the grip of the great powers.

After the outbreak of World War II, Norrmén participated in attempts to develop German support for Finland. He participated in the delegation that received an audience with SS leader Heinrich Himmler in early October 1939 to argue Finland's case, though the delegation failed to obtain any concrete commitments of German support. After the Winter War, he was again involved in founding a committee to build relations with Germany. Together with some other influential Swedish-speaking figures, he strove to get the Swedish People's Party of Finland to adopt a more pro-German line than before. In the spring of 1941, he was involved in recruiting Finnish volunteers for the German SS troops.

During the Continuation War he was active in pro-German organisations, especially in the Finland-Swedish Samfundet Folkgemenskap. He made himself known as an active opponent of the plans for a separate peace with the Soviet Union and in 1943 participated in the writing of a protest address directed at the peace opposition's so-called Group 33. Norrmén was an active advocate of plans to install a pro-German government in Finland, operating on the assumption that Germany would occupy the country and that an occupation-friendly government would then be needed. Norrmén also participated in the founding and publication of the Swedish-language newspaper Aftonposten.

After the end of the Continuation War, when it became clear that a pro-German government was not possible, Norrmén fled in an open boat across the Kvarken to Sweden together with Örnulf Tigerstedt, where he ended up in an internment camp for a few months. He died in Stockholm in the early spring of 1945 due to a cerebral haemorrhage.

== Bibliography ==
- Die nordischen Länder und die Mittelmächte. Denkschrift aus Finnland. Berlin (1916)
- William Ruth. Ett bidrag till Kymmenedalens industrihistoria. Festskrift utgiven i anledning av Karhula bruks 50 års jubileum (1924)
- Firman Ahlström 1896–1927. Minnesskrift (1928)
- Mänttä bruk 1868–1928 (1928)
- Den ekonomiska krisen och de politiska hälsomedlen (1931)
- Arbete och arbetsglädje (1937)
- Politiska essäer (1941)
