= Coler =

Coler or von Coler is a surname. Notable people with the surname include:

- Bird Sim Coler (1867–1941), American stockbroker and politician for whom the hospital is named
- Eugene Seeley Coler (1896–1953), American World War I flying ace while serving in the British Royal Flying Corps
- Nick Coler (born 1952), English musician, producer, composer and songwriter
- Oren P. Coler (1925–1978), justice of the South Dakota Supreme Court
- Edith von Coler (1895–1949), German Nazi propagandist and agent, wife of Ulrich von Coler
- Ulrich von Coler (1885–1953), German officer in both world wars

== See also ==
- Coller, a list of people with the surname
