= Colker =

Colker is a surname. Notable people with the surname include:

- Carlon Colker (born 1965), American physician
- Deborah Colker (born 1960), Brazilian writer, director, dancer, and choreographer
- Marvin Leonard Colker, American palaeographer (1927–2020)
- Ruth Colker (born 1956), American lawyer

== See also ==
- Colfer
- Coller
