= Coller =

Coller is a surname. Notable people with the surname include:

- Amrose B. Coller (1885–1951), American politician
- Barry S. Coller, American physician
- Frank Coller (1866–1938), British lawyer, judge and civil servant
- Jeremy Coller (born 1958), British businessman and philanthropist
- Julius A. Coller (1859–1940), American lawyer and politician
- Ray Coller (1907–1969), Australian rules footballer

== See also ==
- Coler, a list of people with the surname Coler or von Coler
