= Kalervo Kurkiala =

Finnish soldier who later became a pastor

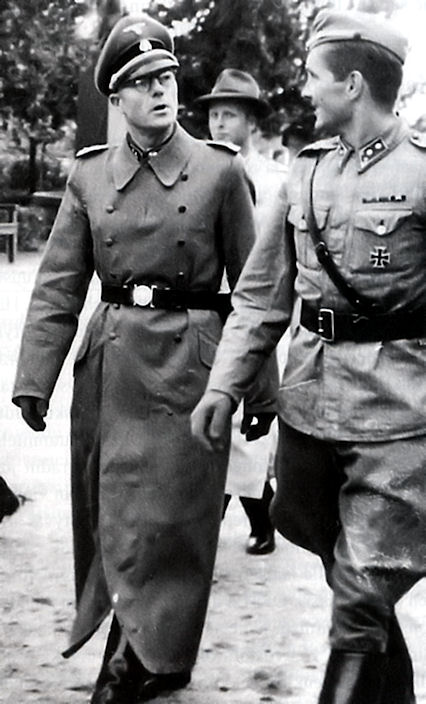
- Major Kalervo Kurkiala (left) Finnish SS battalion, a military liaison officer at his side, Hietaniemi cemetery, 19 September 1943
- Born: Kalervo Groundstroem; 16 November 1894; Längelmäki, Grand Duchy of Finland
- Died: 26 December 1966 (aged 72); Kristinehamn, Sweden
- Occupations: Military chaplain, Pastor

Kalervo Kurkiala (born Kalervo Groundstroem, 16 November 1894 – 26 December 1966) was a Finnish soldier who later became a pastor. During World War I, he served as a volunteer in the German light infantry, his first engagement being on the Misa River in Latvia on the eastern front in 1916. He was a battalion commander in the White Army during the Finnish Civil War, which broke out in 1918. After being ordained in 1919, for a while he was an army chaplain before assuming civilian duties as a pastor and teacher. For several years, he served with the Seamen's mission in Australia. During World War II, in 1941, Kurkiala volunteered as chaplain to the Finnish volunteer brigade in the Waffen-SS. After the war, for many years, he was a pastor in Sweden.

== Early life ==
Kalervo Groundstroem was born in Längelmäki on 16 November 1894. His parents were Karl Johan Gabriel Groundstroem and Aina Fredrika Widbom. His brother was jäger Captain Ensio Groundstroem. In 1913 Groundstroem graduated from the Helsinki Normal school and joined the Hämäläinen student nation. He studied at the Theological Faculty of the University of Helsinki between 1913 and 1915, gaining a first degree in 1914.

Finland was part of the Russian empire throughout Groundstroem's early life. A degree of civil liberty was obtained in 1907, with a parliament elected under universal suffrage. However, the parliament was often dissolved by tsarist Governors General and many Finns despaired of gaining full political rights. Some sympathized with the Russian extremists who were preparing to use force to topple the Russian Empire.

== Soldier ==
On 1 August 1914, Germany declared war on Russia at the start of World War I. Groundstroem left his theological studies and joined the 27th Jäger Battalion (Finland) as a volunteer on 29 December 1915. The Jäger Movement consisted of Finnish volunteers who had slipped away to Germany to train as soldiers and to fight during World War I. Many of these volunteers were motivated by the goal of obtaining Finnish independence from the Russian Empire. Groundstroem was made a lieutenant. He fought in battles on the German Eastern Front on the Misa River, the Gulf of Riga and the Gauja. Groundstroem married Elisabeth Rolfs, a German woman, in 1918.

Groundstroem was influenced by a militarism that he thought beneficial to young men, including "country boys" as well as "bookworms and spoilt, sloppy idlers". In his view, military training, besides preparing a person for the future, built muscle and character. In 1919 he wrote that military service can build an unshakable sense of duty in the individual. The barracks life, where many conscripts live close together, removes pettiness, selfishness and vanity. In another tract, however, he warns recruits of the dangers of barracks life.

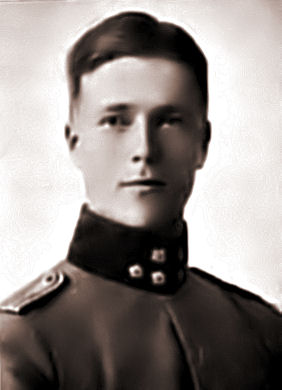
Groundstroem in 1927

After the October Revolution in Russia, the Finnish socialists followed Vladimir Lenin's urging and on 9 November 1917 set up a Revolutionary Central Council of Workers in Helsinki. In December the center-right coalition that controlled parliament declared independence. In January the socialists seized control of Helsinki and announced the Finnish Socialist Workers' Republic. The "White" parliamentary government fled Helsinki. They named Carl Gustaf Emil Mannerheim commander in chief, and he quickly took control of central and northern Finland. Mannerheim, from the Swedish-speaking elite, formed his high command from 84 volunteers from the Swedish army, and his officer corps from 1,130 Jäger volunteers.

Groundstroem returned to Vaasa, the temporary capital of Finland in the White region, and on 25 February 1918 was promoted to lieutenant. In March 1918 he was appointed a battalion commander in the White forces, taking part in battles in Tampere, Lahti, Lyykylä, Mannikkala and Tali, where he was slightly wounded. The civil war ended on 15 May, when the Whites took over Fort Ino, a Russian coastal artillery base on the Karelian Isthmus, from the Russian troops. White Finland and General Mannerheim celebrated the victory with a large military parade in Helsinki on 16 May 1918. Groundstroem served in the General Staff organization from 3 June 1918 until he resigned from the army on 26 June 1919.

== Pastor ==
Groundstroem resumed his theological studies and was ordained a minister in 1919. On 1 August 1919 he was ordered to take the post of pastor to the Central Finland Regiment and Häme cavalry regiment. He resigned from the army again on 1 April 1920, and studied philosophy and theology at the University of Greifswald in Germany from 1920 to 1921. On 1 August 1921 he was appointed pastor of the Jaeger Artillery Regiment. He held this position until 15 April 1922.

After leaving the army, Groundstroem traveled to Australia and worked there as a seamen's chaplain until 1926. In 1926 he was appointed Deputy Secretary of the Finnish Seamen's Mission. During this phase of his life, he changed his last name to the more Finnish-sounding Kurkiala. He was secretary of the Finnish general ecclesiastical committee between 1928 and 1931. On 1 May 1931 he was appointed chaplain of Ikaalinen, and also worked as an English teacher in the Ikaalinen school from 1931 to 1938. Kurkiala obtained a degree in doctrinal education in 1932. He was a member of the local military organization from 1934 to 1938. On 1 May 1938 he was appointed Vicar of Hattula.

== Second World War ==
Kurkiala participated in the Winter War (November 1939 – March 1940) against the Soviet Union as pastor to the 15th Infantry Regiment, which took part in military operations in Summa. When fighting broke out again with the Continuation War in June 1941, he was appointed pastor to the Army of Karelia, and took part in military action in East Karelia.

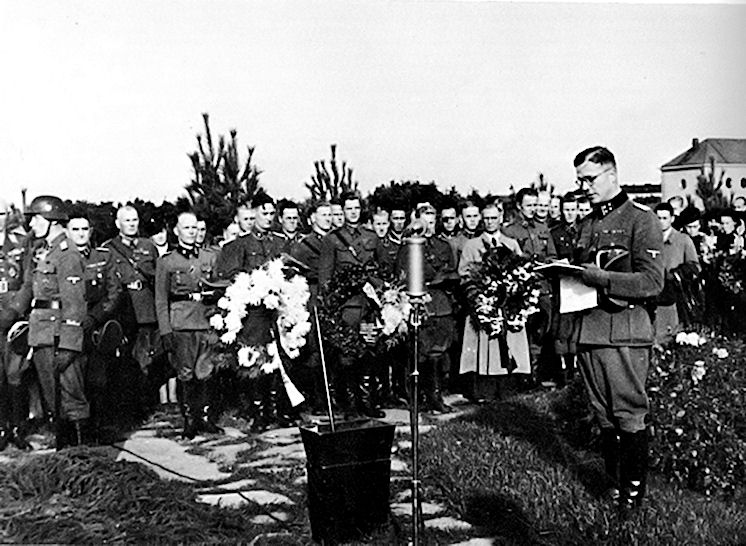
Military chaplain SS-Obersturmbannführer Kalervo Kurkiala making a memorial speech to fallen comrades at Hietaniemi in 1943

Later in 1941, Kurkiala joined the Finnish Volunteer Battalion of the Waffen-SS as its chaplain, succeeding SS-Untersturmfuhrer Ensio Pihkala, who had died. As a former infantryman Kurkiala was well-suited to the job. Fluent in German, he was designated a "liaison officer" with the rank of SS-Hauptsturmfuhrer. Later he became Obersturmbannführer (equivalent to lieutenant colonel).

The volunteer battalion had 834 soldiers, and was attached to the Nordland SS regiment. In December 1941 the Finns fought around the Mius River in the southwest of Russia, and in 1942 fought in the Caucasus. The battalion stayed intact during the subsequent westward retreat, and in May 1943 was sent to Bavaria to recover. The battalion then returned to Finland, where it was disbanded. Kurkiala made a speech to the battalion on 2 June 1943 in which he accused the Prime Minister, Edwin Linkomies, of failing to provide support. He was chairman of the SS Brothers in Arms Association from 1943 to 1944.

== Later career ==
After the war Kurkiala and his family moved to Sweden, where he got a job as a primary school teacher at Sunnersberg. He worked there until 1947, when he became junior lecturer in religion and philosophy at Karlstad Grammar School. In 1950 he was appointed vicar of the Nordmark parish. He held this position until 1953, when he was appointed vicar of the Ör, Dalskog and Gunnarsnäs benefice. Kalervo Kurkiala retired in 1964 and died on 26 December 1966. He was buried in Nordmark, Sweden.

Iivari Rämä's biography of Kalervo Groundstroem (later Kurkiala) was published in 1994, titled Jääkäripapin pitkä marssi (The Jäger Priest’s Long March).

== Bibliography ==
- Carlstedt, A. J.; Winter, Toivo; Kurkiala, Kalervo (1928). Huuto hukkuvien puolesta (in Finnish). Suomen merimieslähetysseura. p. 55.
- Carlstedt, A. J.; Kurkiala, Kalervo; Winter, Toivo (1929). Rädda de drunknande [Save the drowning] (in Swedish). Finska sjömansmissionssällskapet. p. 53.
- Schartum, Sv; Kurkiala, Kalervo (1932). Mies yli laidan ja Joulu taivaassa [Man overboard and Christmas in Heaven] (in Finnish). Suomen merimieslähetysseura. p. 16.
- Schartum, Sv; Kurkiala, Kalervo (1932). Ahdistusten kautta y.m. kertomuksia (in Finnish). Suomen merimieslähetysseura. p. 47.
- Schartum, Sv; Kurkiala, Kalervo (1935). Merimiehen morsian [Sailor's bride] (in Finnish). Suomen merimieslähetysseura. p. 48.
- Kurkiala, Kalervo (1938). Pidä mitä sinulla on: ohjeita elämän matkaa varten [Keep what you have: instructions for the journey of life] (in Finnish). Suomen merimieslähetysseura. p. 31.
