= Colfer =

Colfer is a surname. Notable people with the surname include:

- Chris Colfer (born 1990), American actor, singer, author, producer, and writer
- Eoin Colfer (born 1965), Irish author and comedian
- Martin Colfer (died 2015), Irish football (soccer) player
- Ned Colfer (born 1941), Irish hurler, sportsperson
- Terence Colfer, Canadian diplomat
