= Events preceding World War II in Europe =

The events preceding World War II in Europe are closely tied to the bellicosity of Fascist Italy, Nazi Germany, Francoist Spain, Imperial Japan, and the Soviet Union, as well as the Great Depression. The peace movement led to appeasement and disarmament.

== Aftermath of World War I ==
World War II is generally viewed as having its roots in the aftermath of World War I, in which the German Empire under Wilhelm II, with its Central Powers, was defeated, chiefly by the United Kingdom, France, and the United States.

The victors blamed Germany entirely for the war and all resulting damages; it was Germany that effectively started the war with an attack on France through Belgium. France had, in 1871, suffered a defeat in the Franco-Prussian War, and demanded compensation for financial devastation during the First World War, which ensured that the various peace treaties, specifically the Treaty of Versailles would impose tough financial war reparations and restrictions on Germany in the aftermath of World War I.

The dissolution of Austria-Hungary and the revolutions of 1917–1923 at the end of the First World War also resulted in the formation of numerous new nation-states such as the Second Polish Republic, the First Czechoslovak Republic, and the Kingdom of Yugoslavia in Central and Eastern Europe. Germany was forced to make territorial cessions to these new countries, giving part of its eastern territories of Poznań, West Prussia, and Upper Silesia to Poland. It was also prohibited from merging with the Republic of German-Austria formed from the former German-speaking regions of Austria-Hungary. The treaty ceded Alsace–Lorraine to the French Third Republic, Eupen-Malmedy to Belgium, Northern Schleswig to Denmark, Hultschin District to Czechoslovakia, and allowed the Saarland to be occupied as a League of Nations territory. German irredentists refused to recognize the legitimacy of the new Central and Eastern European nation states, and demanded the return of Germany's lost territory.

The total defeat of the Imperial German Armed Forces had been unexpected due to censorship of German defeats. After the war German nationalists created a stab-in-the-back myth that the German Empire had not been defeated at the front and had been betrayed by "November criminals" such as socialists and Jews.

The British naval blockade of Germany was not lifted until the treaty was signed at the end of June 1919.

== Rise of fascism ==
After several liberal governments failed to deal with these threats, and the fascists had increased their public profile by highly visible punishment expeditions to supposedly crush the socialist threat, King Victor Emmanuel III of Italy invited Benito Mussolini to form a government on 29 October 1922. The fascists maintained an armed paramilitary wing, which they employed to fight anarchists, communists, and socialists.

Within a few years, Mussolini had consolidated dictatorial power and Italy became a police state. On 7 January 1935, he and French Foreign Minister Pierre Laval signed the Franco-Italian Agreement, giving him a free hand in the Abyssinia Crisis with the Ethiopian Empire, in return for an alliance against Hitler. There was little international protest. He then sent large forces into Eritrea and Italian Somaliland, the two Italian colonies that bordered Ethiopia.

Britain attempted to broker peace but failed; Mussolini was bent on conquest. Britain declared an arms embargo on both Italy and Ethiopia, but cleared its warships from the Mediterranean, further allowing Italy unhindered access. Shortly after the League of Nations exonerated both parties in the Walwal incident, Italy attacked Ethiopia, resulting in the Second Italo-Abyssinian War.

Shortly after Italy conquered Ethiopia, the Spanish Civil War began, seen by many as a proving ground for World War II, Germany provided troops, weapons, and other aid to Francisco Franco's nationalists. Italy also provided troops. On 7 April 1939, Italy invaded Albania. After a short campaign the Albanian Kingdom was occupied and joined Italy in a personal union.

== Rise of Nazi Germany ==
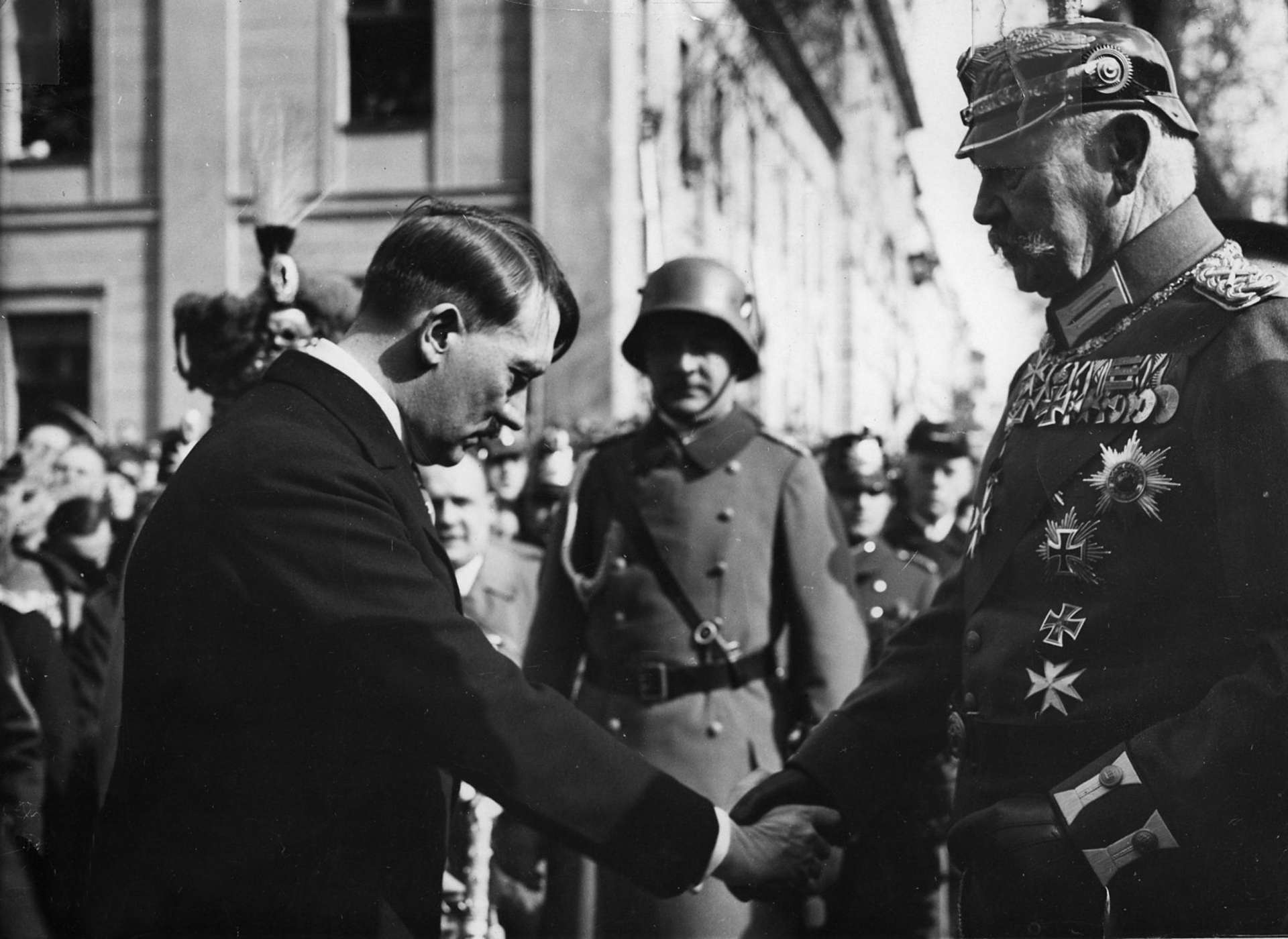
Paul von Hindenburg and Adolf Hitler presided over the abolition of German democracy in 1933

The Nazi Party, led by Adolf Hitler, blamed Germany's ruined economy on the harshness of the Versailles Treaty, on faults of democracy, and on the stab-in-the-back legend. In Germany, as in post-Austro-Hungarian Austria, citizens recalled the pre-war years under autocratic rule as prosperous but the post-war years under weak democratic rule as chaotic and economically disastrous.

Nazism held that the world was composed of distinct races in a state of constant ethnic war, and that the Aryan race inhabiting Germany needed to conquer new agricultural land in Central and Eastern Europe to survive. Hitler also believed that the Jews and the Slavs, which he believed were responsible for creating Communism and the Soviet Union, threatened the racial purity of Germany and would have to be exterminated.

The situation was further aggravated by the worldwide economic depression that followed the Wall Street crash of 1929. Left- and right-wing anti-democratic parties in the Reichstag—the German parliament—obstructed parliamentary work, while different cabinets resorted to government by Article 48 of the Weimar Constitution. This enabled the President and Cabinet to bypass the Parliament. The Nazis grew in popularity due to the impact of the Great Depression, and President Paul von Hindenburg completed Adolf Hitler's rise to power by appointing him Chancellor of Germany in January 1933.

While many states refused to become involved in the Spanish Civil War, notably Britain and France, troops were sent by both Hitler and Mussolini to aid the Spanish Nationalists, which included those with fascist leanings. It would prove to be a precursor to many of the tactics and methods employed in the Second World War, such as the Bombing of Guernica, which aimed to see how effective bombing of civilian areas could be. Francoist Spain was non-belligerent during World War II—although Spanish volunteers fought on the Eastern Front—but the civil war division of fascism versus democracy and communism was repeated.

== German expansionism ==
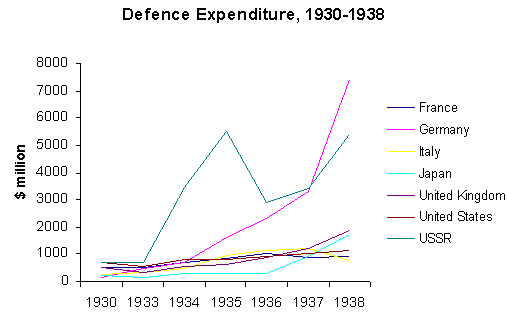
Defence expenditures of major belligerents of World War II from 1930 to 1938

Meanwhile, in Germany, once political consolidation—Gleichschaltung—was in place, the Nazis turned their attention to foreign policy with several increasingly daring acts. The Nazis introduced a massive rearmament program to build up the Wehrmacht beyond the limits imposed by the Versailles Treaty. On 16 March 1935, Hitler ignored the Versailles Treaty and ordered Germany to re-arm, reintroducing military conscription. The treaty had limited the German Reichswehr to 100,000 men with few arms.

These steps produced nothing more than official protests from the United Kingdom and France; they were more serious about enforcing the economic provisions of the treaty than its military restrictions. Many Britons felt the restrictions placed on Germany in Versailles had been too harsh, and they believed that Hitler's aim was simply to undo the extremes of the treaty, not to go beyond that. This sentiment was underscored by the signing of the Anglo-German Naval Agreement, which authorized Germany to build a fleet one third the size of the Royal Navy.

Hitler moved troops into the Rhineland on 7 March 1936. But, as before, Hitler's defiance was met with inaction, despite Poland's proposal to put the Franco-Polish Military Alliance into action. In 1936, Hitler demanded a private meeting with Arnold J. Toynbee, a British historian, philosopher of history, research professor of International History at the London School of Economics and the University of London and author of numerous books. He was visiting Berlin at the time to address the Nazi Law Society. Toynbee accepted.

In the meeting, Hitler emphasized his limited expansionist aim of building a Greater Germanic Reich, and his desire for British understanding and cooperation. Toynbee was convinced of Hitler's sincerity, and endorsed Hitler's message in a confidential memorandum for British prime minister Stanley Baldwin and foreign secretary Anthony Eden.

The first non-violent German conquest was the Federal State of Austria. As early as 1934 the Nazis arranged a failed coup attempt which succeeded in assassinating Chancellor Engelbert Dollfuss. After Italy had joined Germany in the Anti-Comintern Pact, quickly removing the main obstacle of an Anschluss of Austria, Germany announced the annexation on 12 March 1938, making it the province Gau Ostmark of what was now Greater Germany.

=== Czechoslovakia ===
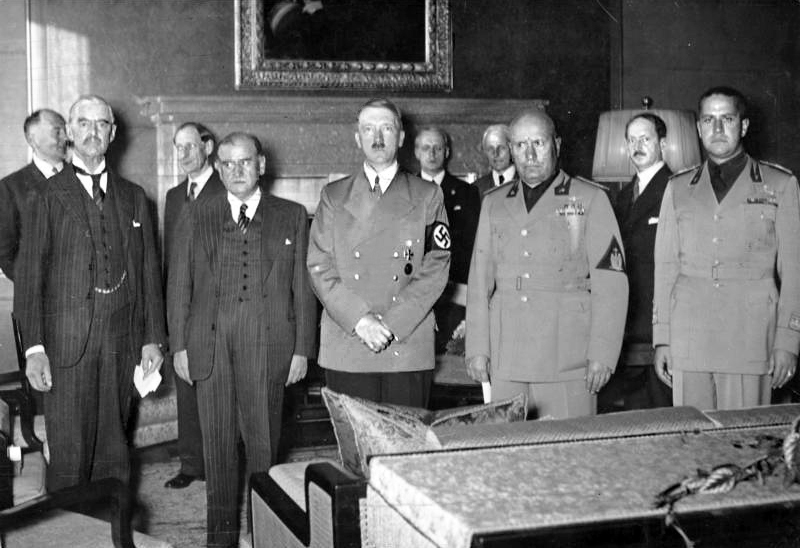
Chamberlain, Daladier, Hitler, Mussolini, and Ciano pictured before signing the Munich Agreement

With Austria secured, Hitler turned his attention to the German-speaking population of Sudetenland border regions of Czechoslovakia. Czechoslovakia had a large and modern army backed with a sizable armament industry, and had military alliances with France and the Soviet Union. It also had informal links with the United Kingdom, largely due to the United Kingdom being militarily allied with France.

Despite this, Hitler, encouraged by reluctance of major European powers to stop his violation of post World War I treaties, was prepared to risk war. He was convinced that France would shrink back again, not fulfilling her treaty obligations to Czechoslovakia. His first order was to seize Sudetenland, based on the right of self-determination for a unification with Germany. This region formed about a third of Bohemia (western Czechoslovakia) in terms of territory, population and economy, and was claimed to be vital for Czechoslovakia's existence. With Austria in German hands, this part of Czechoslovakia—equipped with a defense system that was larger than the Maginot Line—was nearly surrounded by Germany.

Following lengthy negotiations and blatant war threats from Hitler, British Prime Minister Neville Chamberlain with French leaders tried to appease Hitler. In the Munich Agreement of 30 September 1938, the major European powers allowed German troops to occupy the Sudetenland, for the sake of "peace for our time". Czechoslovakia had already mobilized over one million men and was prepared to fight for independence, but was not allowed to participate in the conference.

When the French and British negotiators informed the Czechoslovak representatives about the agreement, and that if Czechoslovakia would not accept it, France and Britain would consider Czechoslovakia to be responsible for war, President Edvard Beneš capitulated. German forces entered the Sudetenland unopposed, celebrated by the local ethnic German population. Soon after, Polish and Hungarian forces also invaded parts of Czechoslovakia.

Poland annexed the Trans-Olza area. Hitler continued to put pressure on the Czech government. On 14 March, Slovakia declared its independence under Jozef Tiso, which was recognized by France, Britain and other important powers. The following day, Emil Hácha accepted a German occupation of the remaining parts of the Czech lands. From the Prague Castle, the Protectorate of Bohemia and Moravia was proclaimed by Hitler.

=== Baltics ===
The Memel Territory, separated from Germany since 1920 and annexed by Lithuania, was returned to Germany, under a German–Lithuanian treaty concluded after the 1939 German ultimatum to Lithuania. The preparations for the Second World War were also made in the economic sphere, as the German government exerted pressure on weaker governments to place their economies at the disposal of the German war machine. One such case was the German–Romanian economic agreement of 23 March 1939.
