= 27th Jäger Battalion (Finland) =

German elite light infantry unit (1915–1918)

- Königlich Preussisches Jägerbataillon Nr. 27
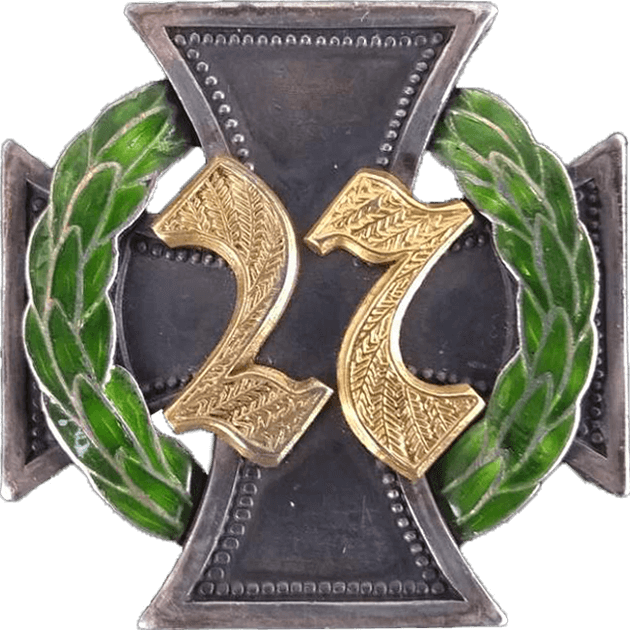
- The Jäger cross (Finnish: Jääkäriristi)
- Active: 1915–1918
- Country: German Empire
- Role: Jäger
- Size: Battalion
- Garrison/HQ: Locksted Lager, Liepāja
- Engagements: World War I

The 27th Jäger Battalion, officially called the Royal Prussian 27th Jäger Battalion (German: Königlich Preussisches Jägerbataillon Nr. 27, Finnish: Kuninkaallinen preussilainen jääkäripataljoona 27) was a jäger battalion of the Imperial German Army during World War I. The unit mainly consisted of Finnish volunteers that were a part of the Jäger movement.

The recruitment of the Jäger volunteers from the Russian Grand Duchy of Finland had to be secret, and was dominated by German-influenced circles, such as university students and the upper middle class. The recruitment was however in no way exclusive. The recruits were transported across Finland's western border via Sweden to Germany, where the volunteers were formed into the Royal Prussian 27th Jäger Battalion. It was a continuation and expansion of the "Boy Scout Training" (Pfadfinderkursus).

== Scout course and permanent training group ==
Later, the Pfadfinderkursus received more permanent forms and the course was changed into a permanent training group in Lockstedt, the Ausbildungs-Truppe-Lockstedt, which had given military training to Finnish volunteers eager to fight for independence.

More than 200 university students had participated in the so-called Boy Scout training – they dressed in Boy Scout uniforms during training, and they became the officers of the Finnish Jäger Troops. This group was expanded by extensive recruitment in the autumn of 1915 and spring of 1916. The goal was to increase the unit to 1,200 men, including artillery and pioneers. As the new recruits included working class young men and farmers as well as sailors, not many of them knew German. It was therefore necessary to create military guide books in Finnish, and a command vocabulary was created.

On 9 May 1916, the Lockstedt training group (Ausbildungs-Truppe-Lockstedt) was designated the Royal Prussian Jaeger Battalion number 27 (Königlich Preussisches Jägerbataillon Nr. 27) and received new, green German Jaeger uniforms. Some of the soldiers to be trained stayed in Ausbildungs-Truppe-Lockstedt and their unit preserved its name. If the number of the recruits had increased enough, Ausbildungs-Truppe-Lockstedt would itself have been formed in due course as a Jaeger battalion, but with the number 28 (i.e. German: Königlich Preussisches Jägerbataillon Nr. 28). This did not happen as there was no political initiative for this in Finland or in Germany, which were preparing for a separate peace with the Russian Empire in order to fight more effectively on the Western Front against France and the United Kingdom.

== Regular battalion ==
To achieve experience from warfare, the main part of the Ausbildungs-Truppe-Lockstedt became a regular Jaeger battalion, the Royal Prussian Jaeger battalion number 27 (German: Königlich Preussisches Jägerbataillon Nr. 27), which was used with relatively modest losses to attain experience, but also re-trained for the more technically demanding duties of artillery, engineers, supplies, etc. in order to establish this expertise in the future national army of the independent state of Finland.

The Jaeger Battalion participated in the ranks of the 8th German Army from 1916 in the battles of World War I on the northern flank of the Eastern Front. After the outbreak of the Civil War in Finland, Jaegers who intended to engage on the "White" (anti-communist) side in the war were released.

== Periods ==
=== Pfadfinder-Kursus Lockstedter Lager ===
Pfadfinderkursus – the Pathfinder course – was the beginning of the new Finnish military training, as it had been abolished in the Grand Duchy of Finland due to the political schism in Finland between the Finns and the Russian imperial government. There were 189 Finns, one Norwegian Swede (Gösta af Geijerstam) and one Balt, altogether 191.

On 26 January 1915, the representatives of the German ministries for foreign affairs and also war, general headquarters and navy headquarters had made a decision to provide military training for 200 Finns. The commander was major Maximilian Bayer, who was a war veteran from the German African colonies and the chairman of the German Scout league, Deutsche Pfadfinderbund, which he established in 1907 and of which he served as the chairman, Reichsfeldmeister. In World War I, he had served in the Regiment Prinz Louis-Ferdinand, the 27th Infantry Regiment, and took part in the attack against Liège in Belgium. Thereafter, he had served as the German commandant of Liège from 5 January 1915. The original idea was to nominate the commander, one infantry captain and one pioneer captain, but the decision was to nominate four captains: Julius Knaths, Hans Bade, Walter Just and Karld Heldt. They all reported to the German Ministry for War on 13 February for instructions. In April 1915, Offiziersverstellvertreter Hans Eller was also ordered to the Pathfinder course, for machine gun training. From 12 to 13 non-commissioned officers were ordered to attend the course, and also six pioneers. The master sergeants (Fäbel) were Perper and Steinmuller, and the non-commissioned officers in lower ranks (Unteroffiziers) were Claussen, Huyssen, Hoden and Toeppel. Hoden and Toeppel were assigned to other duties later. The pioneer non-commissioned officer Claussen and machine gun trainer Huyssen continued to serve during the 27th Battalion period and became lieutenants.

The first Pathfinders came to the Lockstedt military training camp on 25 February 1915. The oldest member of the course was Alma Fabritius, who stayed for four months. Another older participant, doctor Marcus Kjöllerfeld, stayed six weeks from 25 February to April.

Month	Finland	Germany	Denmark	Norway	USA	Total	Accumulated	Resigned
February	63					63	63	
March	66	9	1			76	139	
April	8	3				11	150	−1
May	2	1	1			5	155	
June	3					3	158	
July	3					3	161	
August	3	2			1	6	167	

Later, when already Jaegers, two ex-Pathfinders resigned and two died from disease, Runar Appelberg and Urho Kalsko. Already in the service of the Guards, majors Friedel Jacobson, Olof Lagus and Armas Ståhlberg were killed in action in the Finnish Civil War 1918, as were Rittmeister (cavalry captain) Paul Ljungberg and Captain Bertel Paulig. Six other ex-Pathfinders died in the Civil War. Two of them were master sergeants (Fäbel) and the third was a sergeant. The last three did not have any military rank in Finland, for unknown reasons.

Captain Toivo Kuisma died in the Aunus attack in 1919, and Major Sven Weckström in 1921, having been wounded in Maaninkajärvi that year.

Later, the ex-Pathfinders achieved high military ranks:

Rank		
Infantry general	3	A. E. Heinrichs, A. Sihvo, A. Sundman
Lieutenant-general	10	
Major-general	12	A. R. Danielson
Colonel	30	
Lieutenant-colonel	26	
Major	38	
Captain and Rittmeister (cavalry captain)	29	
Lieutenant	14	
2nd lieutenant	3	
Total	165	

=== Ausbildungs-Truppe-Lockstedt ===
- September 1915 – May 1916

=== Royal Prussian Jaegerbattallion number 27 9 May 1916 Königlich Preussisches Jägerbataillon Nr. 27 ===
==== 1916 ====
Many German officers served in the battalion. The first commander was Major Maximillian Bayer, who became later a regimental commander on the Western Front. After him, the commander was Captain Julius Knaths.

German officer	Military rank	Unit
Ausfeld	captain	
Basse	lieutenant	
Braun	senior lieutenant	
Claussen	lieutenant	
von Coler	lieutenant captain	
Franzen	lieutenant	
Haase	lieutenant	
Höcker	lieutenant captain	
Jacobssen	lieutenant	
Just	captain	
Knaths	captain	
von Mangold	captain	
Ladewig		assistant doctor
Mellis	lieutenant	
Oberdörfer	lieutenant	
Rütz	lieutenant	
Schultze	lieutenant	
Stahel	senior lieutenant	
Wilhelmsson	lieutenant	

Battalion	1st rifle company	2nd rifle company	3rd rifle company	4th rifle company	Engineer company	Artillery unit	Signals unit
Major Maximillian Bayer; Hauptzugführer Erik Jernström							

==== Misa river period ====
Month	Officers	Others	Promoted	Decorated	Deceased	Released	Horses
May						l	
June					Jäger Alfred Hyytinen: 13 June 2 o'clock; artillery grenade; position of the 1st company Jäger Max August Kronqvist; 25 June; artillery grenade Jäger Matti Nykänen; 25 June; hospital; Skrabbe; Skrabbe war grave		
July					Jäger Paavo Kinnunen: 25 July; 24 July shot in the head; Smārde (Schmarden); Tukums war grave		
August					Jäger Ilmari Pahkajärvi: 15 August; artillery grenade to the truce; Misa River		

==== Riga bay period ====
Month	Officers	Others	Promoted	Decorated	Deceased	Released	Horses
September					Jäger Frans Heinonen: 15 September; grenade fragmentation onto forehead; Riga Bay; Dumbe war grave Jäger Einar Myntti; 20 September; killed in patrol; Riga Bay; Dumbe war grave Jäger Emil Kantola; 20 September; engineers protecting squad, shot by the Russians; Riga Bay; Dumbe war grave		
October				[			
November							
December					Jäger Konrad Pehrsson: 1 December; - – Riga Bay: Dumbe war grave		

==== Liepāja Christmas period ====
Month	Officers	Others	Promoted	Decorated	Deceased	Released	Horses
December							

==== Lielupe (Misse) period 1916/1917 ====
Month	Officers	Others	Promoted	Decorated	Deceased	Released	Horses
December							
January							
February							
March							

==== Liepāja training period 1917/1918 ====
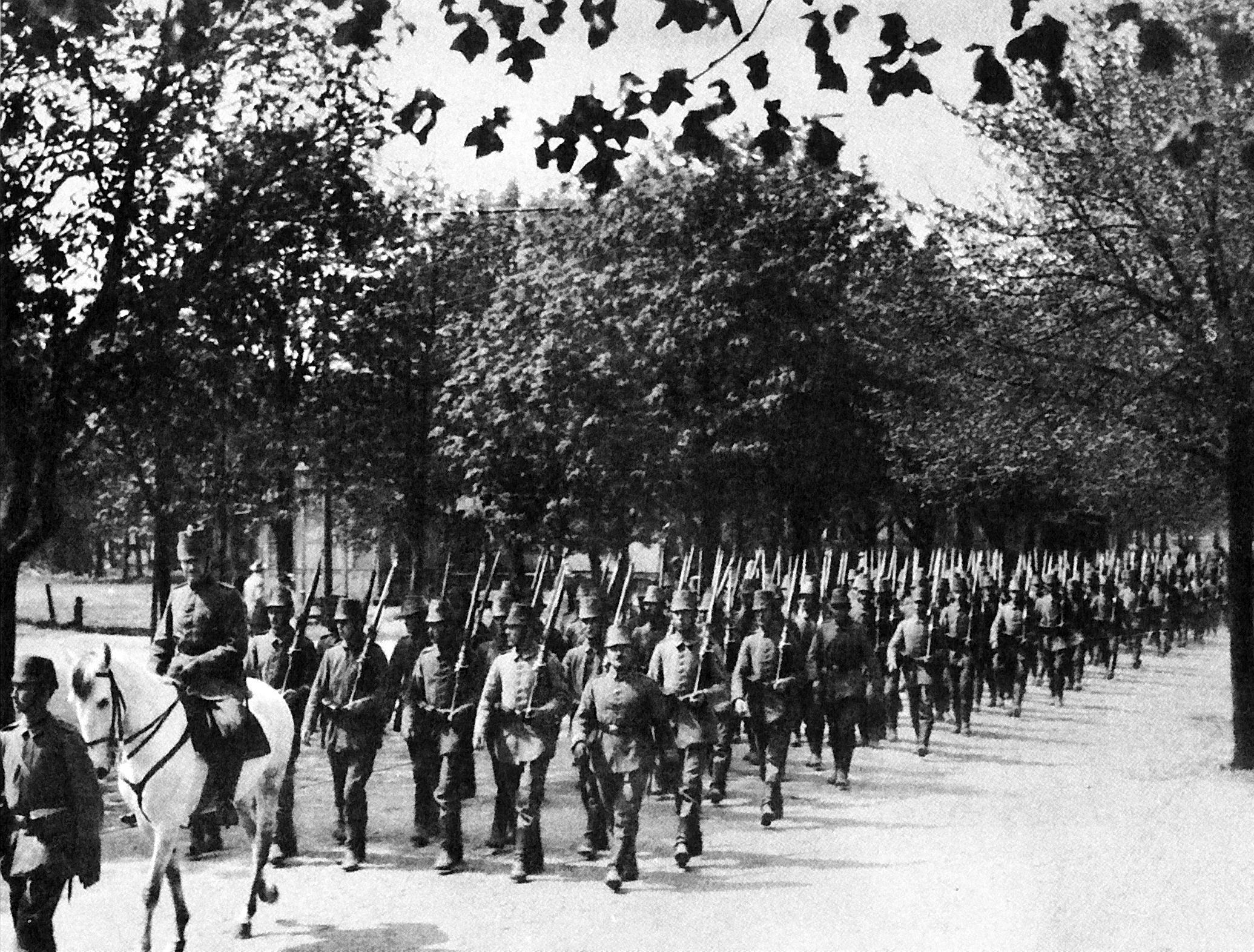
The pioneer company of the battalion returning from a parade in Liepāja (Libau). The company commander riding on the white horse is Lieutenant Basse. The battalion stayed almost a year in Liepāja for special training in 1917 after the Riga Bay period of 1916.

Battalion	1st rifle company	2nd rifle company	3rd rifle company	4th rifle company	Engineer company	Artillery unit	Signals unit
Captain Julius Knaths; Hauptzugführer Erik Jernström							

Month	Officers	Others	Promoted	Decorated	Deceased	Released	Horses
April	34	1277			Jäger August Jukarainen – 21 April – hospital – Thorn; Jäger Herman Hirvonen – 27 April (notification): hospital; – Jelgava (Mitau)		186
May	37	1314			Jäger Kustaa Heinonen: 5 May; hospital; Liepāja (Libau); Jäger Wilhelm Blomberg; 16 May; suicide attempt 15 May	14 Jägers of D. U.: 14 April	190
June	36	1316			Gruppenführer Rudolf Jahnke −20 June -hospital -Altona		190
July	36	1297			Hilfsgruppenführer Johannes Ammunet: 6 July; suicide attempt 5 July; Liepāja (Linbau); Jäger Karl Hellman; 15 July; hospital; Liepāja (Libau); Oberzugführer Runar Appelberg; 22 July (notification); hospital; Tukums (Tukkum)		190
August	34	1271	Zugführer 14: 9 August; Gruppenführer 21; 11 August; Hilfsgruppenführer 48; 25 August		Jäger Matti Fält; 13 August: hospital; Hannover; Jäger August Tenno; 25 August; hospital; Szczecin ( Stettin)		191
September	34	1342	Zugführer 3: 19 September; Gruppenführer 8; 19 September; Hilfsgruppenführer 26; 19 September				159
October	24	1293	Zugführer 1: 28 October; Gruppenführer 1; 28 October; Hilfsgruppenführer 34; 28 October	iron cross 4	Jäger Erik Martois: 26 October; hospital; Altona		155
November	22	1280					157
December	22	1265	Oberzugführer 3: 25 December; Zugführer 3; 25 December; Gruppenführer 21; 25 December; Hilfsgruppenführer 25; 25 December			30 Jägers: 11 December; 40 Jägers; 17 December; 40 Jägers; 29 December	163
January							
February							

Later, as Jaegers, two ex-Pathfinders resigned and two died from disease, Runar Appelberg and Urho Kalsko.

==== 1918 ====
Already in the service of the Guards, Majors Friedel Jacobson, Olof Lagus and Armas Ståhlberg were killed in action in the Finnish Civil War in 1918, as were Rittmeister (Cavalry captain) Paul Ljungberg and Captain Bertel Paulig. Six other ex-Pathfinders also died in the Civil War. Two of them were master sergeants (Fäbel), and the third was a sergeant. The last three did not have any military rank, for unknown reasons.

==== Killed in action in Finland 1918 ====
- Lauri Kutilainen, aliupseeri, 21 June 1896 – 3 April 1918.
- Ahti Johannes Karppinen, vänrikki, 25 August 1895 – 28 April 1918.
- Matti Leonard Kokko, korpraali, 23 October 1893 – 3 April 1918.
- Nikolai Matias Perälä, aliupseeri, 23 August 1892 – 4 April 1918.
- Johannes Pärmi, aliupseeri, 27 January 1892 – 5 April 1918.
- Oivo Urbanus Rustanius, vänrikki, 17 July 1893 – 8 April 1918.
- Frans Sandstedt, aliupseeri, 17 July 1899 – 3 April 1918.
- Johan Vilhelms Sjöholm, vääpeli, 9 June 1897 – 3 April 1918.
- Elias Teppola, aliupseeri, 25 December 1895 – 4 April 1918.
- Emil Vainionpää, vääpeli, 7 January 1892 – 3 April 1918.
- Juho Veijalainen, aliupseeri, 20 June 1892 – 3 April 1918.

==== 1919 ====
Captain Toivo Kuisma died in the Aunus attack 1919 and Major Sven Weckström in 1921, having been wounded in Maaninkajärvi that year.

==== Military ranks ====
Rank
Hauptzugführer (chief platoon leader)	
Oberzugführer (senior platoon leader)	Friedel Jacobsson
Zugführer (platoon leader)	Aarne Heikinheimo; Tauno Juvonen
Gruppenführer (squad leader)	Johan Forsman; Osmo Grönroos; Mikko Kohonen; Åke Sumelius
Hilfsgruppenführer (assistant squad leader)	
Jäger (light infantry private)	38

Month		
Infantry general	3	A. E. Heinrichs, A. Sihvo, A. Sundman
Lieutenant-general	10	
Major-general	12	
Colonel	30	
Lieutenant-colonel	26	
Major	38	
Captain and Rittmeister (cavalry captain)	29	
Lieutenant	14	
2nd lieutenant	3	
Total	165	

- May 1916 – February 1918

==== Misa river period ====
- June 1916 – August 1916

==== Riga Bay period ====
- September 1916 – December 1916

==== Lielupe period ====
- December 1916 – March 1917

==== Liepāja training period ====
The Liepāja training period consisted all kinds of special training from general leadership to special skills.

Course	Beginning	End	Place	Goal

===== March 1917 =====
- 25 March 1917 – 13 February 1918

===== April 1917 =====
- 1 April 1917, 34 officers, 1277 others and 186 horses
- 2 April 1917, general von Shotzes inspection
- 10 April 1917, ten iron crosses for the jaegers
- 17 April 1917, politicians Fabritius, von Essen and Ekola paid visit
- 27 April 1917, notification of jaeger Herman Hirvonen's death in a hospital in Jelgava (then Mitau),

Date	Officers	Others	Horses
1 May 1917	37	1,344	190
1 June 1917	36	1,316	190
1 July 1917	36	1,297	190
1 August 1917	34	1,271	191
1 September 1917	34	1,342	159
1 October 1917	24	1,293	155
1 November 1917	22	1,280	157

== Jäger ==
- Kalervo Kurkiala (lieutenant)
- Rudolf Axel Danielson (21 March 1888 Pernå – 17 October 1938) was a Finnish Jaeger Major. His parents were the gardener and naval officer, Karl Gustaf Danielson and Emilia Sofia Johansson. His wife was Anna Maria Arlander.
- Heikki Nurmio

== See also ==
- 8th Ersatz Division (German Empire)
- Klapkalnciems
