= Ulrich von Coler =

German war criminal

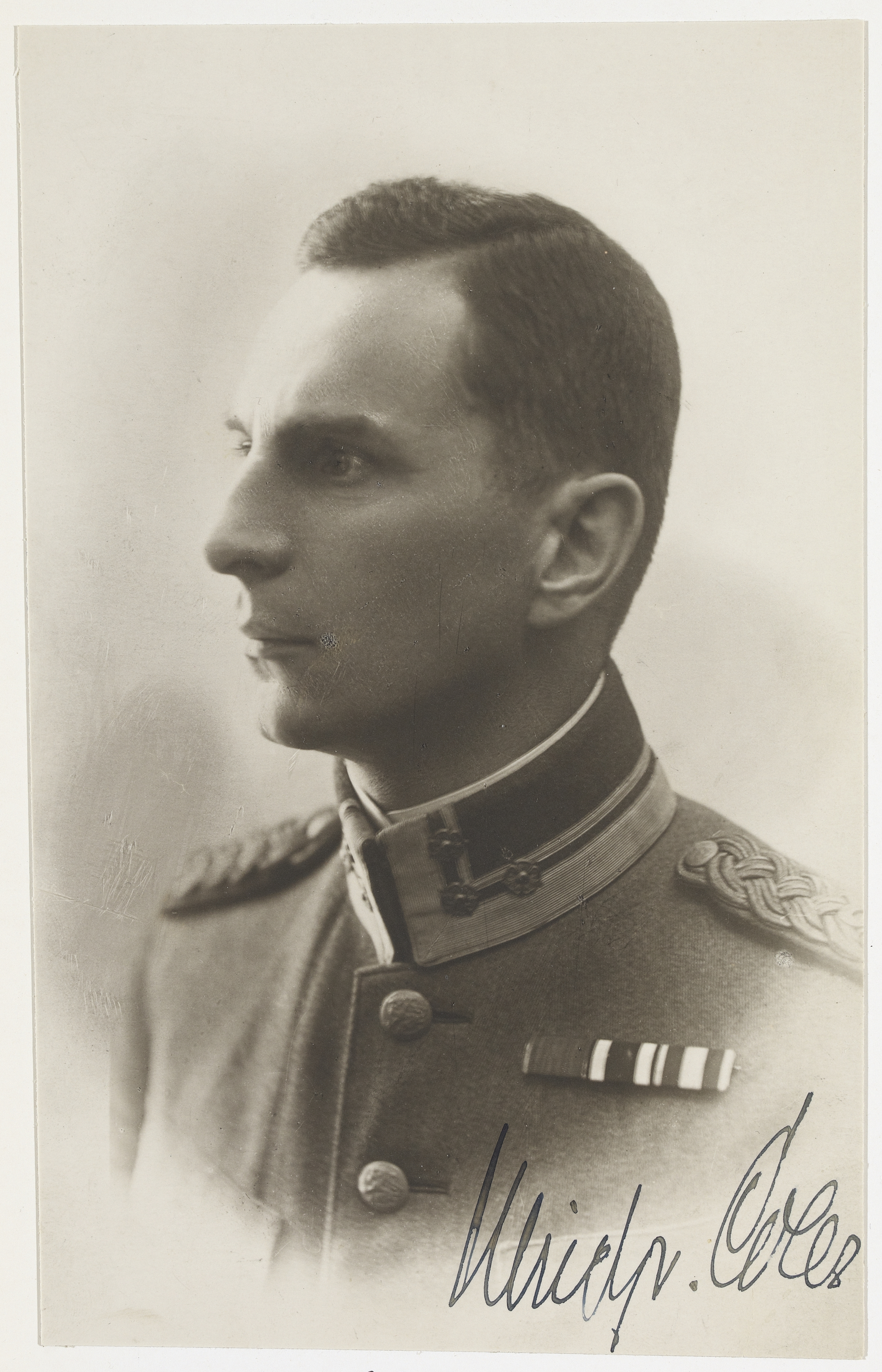
- Ulrich von Coler, 1920
- Born: 6 December 1885; Küstrin (now Kostrzyn nad Odrą), Kingdom of Prussia
- Died: 19 May 1953 (aged 67); Timmendorfer Strand, West Germany
- Spouse: Edith von Coler (m. 1917– d. 1922)
- Military career
- Allegiance: German Empire; Finland; Nazi Germany
- Branch: Imperial German Army; Finnish White Guard; Wehrmacht
- Rank: (German Empire) Oberleutnant (Finland) Eversti (Nazi Germany) Oberst
- Commands: Feldkommandantur 810
- Conflicts: World War I; Western Front; Finnish Civil War; World War II; Invasion of Poland; Battle of France

Ulrich von Coler (6 December 1885 – 19 May 1953) was an Oberleutnant in the Imperial German Army during World War I and an Oberst in the Finnish White Guard and Wehrmacht Heer in World War II. During the Finnish Civil War, he was one of 38 German officers in Finland and commanded the 2nd Jaeger Brigade Itäarmeija in Hanko. In 1919, Coler wrote a book called "Suomalaisten jääkärien parissa: muistelmia yhteistyön ajoilta 1915–1918" (With the Finnish Jägers 1915–1918), a curriculum vitae of his time in Finland during the First World War.

During the Second World War, he was assigned command of a Feldgendarmerie unit, Feldkommandantur 810 (FK 810), and oversaw and perpetrated war crimes in Poland and the Crimea.

== Early life and World War I ==
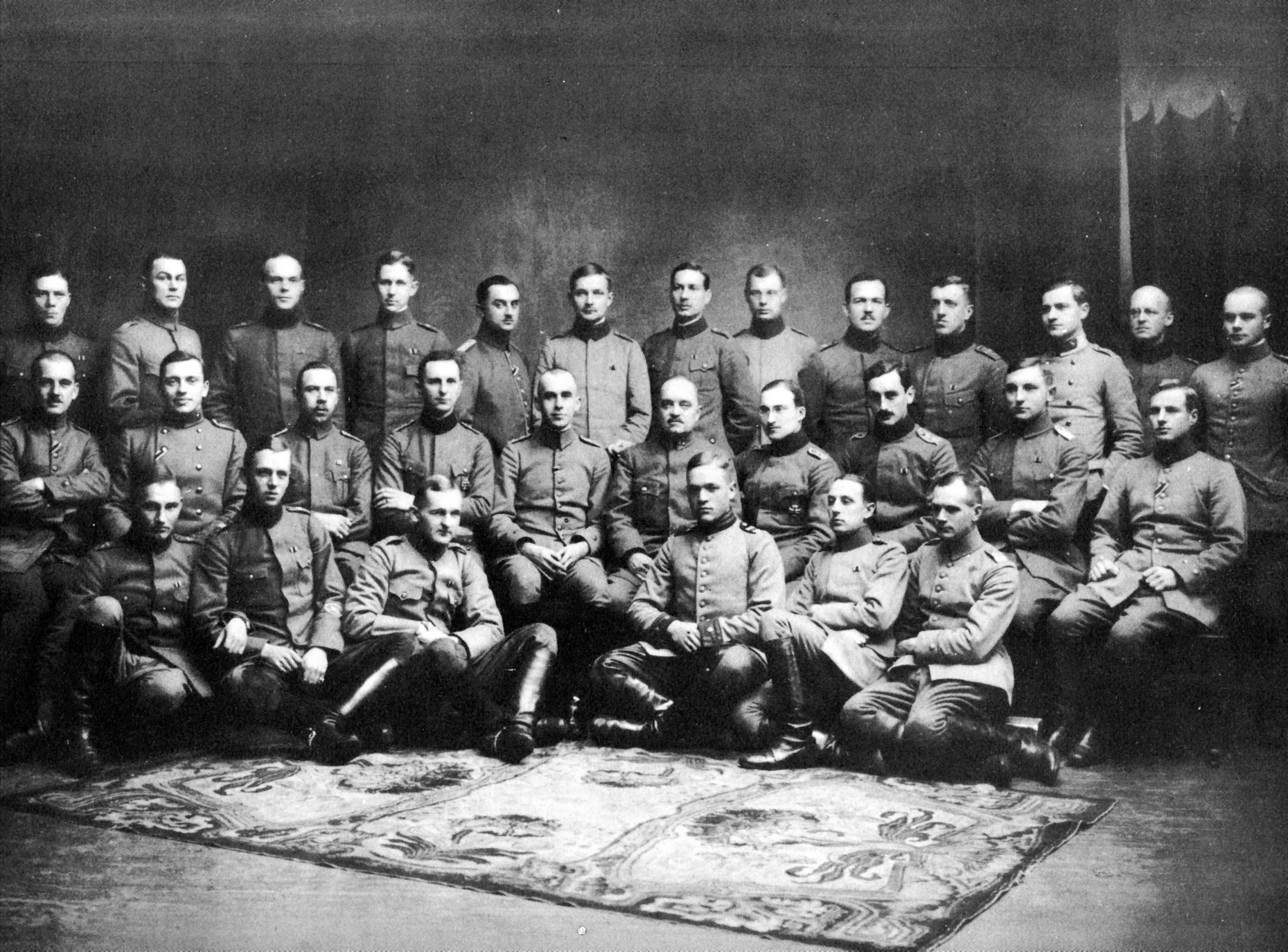
Officers of the Royal Prussian 27th Jäger Battalion in Liepāja, Autumn 1917. Captain Ulrich von Coler is in the middle row, the fourth man from the left.

Coler was born on 6 December 1885, in Küstrin (Modern day Poland), in the Kingdom of Prussia. He was born to a military family and his father, once the Imperial district commander of Bielefeld, sent Coler to a military school once he completed basic schooling in 1906. He enlisted in the German Imperial Army in 1915 in the town of Lockstedt as a lieutenant. The next year, Coler was sent to fight in the Finnish Civil War as a captain, along with 38 other German officers, to command a 1258-strong Third Company of the Finnish 27th Jäger Battalion in Estonia. In early March 1918, Coler arrived in Finland, becoming the commander of the Finnish 2nd Division, where he remained until the victory of the White Finns over the communists in the Finnish Civil War.

In 1917, Coler married Edith von Coler and had a daughter, named Jutta, in 1919. Three years later they separated.

== World War II ==
Coler had intended to become a career officer, but he was not included in the Weimar Republic's 100,000-man army. Embittered, Coler blamed the recent revolutions in his 1919 curriculum vitae for the end of his military career. Now aimless like many other post-war junior officers, Coler had to take on more temporary civilian work but wanted to make his military training, education, and experience work for him, which landed him a job as the chief of a Finnish Schutzkorps, but he also made money writing romanticized war literature for a local magazine. When the Nazi Party reintroduced conscription, Coler returned to Germany and reenlisted in the Wehrmacht, which gave him command of a regiment in the invasion of Poland in 1939. After the Battle of France in 1940, Coler got FK 810 transferred back to the Eastern Front.

== Personality and views ==
After the war, former subordinates of Coler testified in 1953 before the Düsseldorf district court that their commander was arrogant, strict, and unapproachable, was proud of his noble Prussian heritage, referred to himself in the third person, and demanded his orders be followed to the letter. Former members of Feldkommandantur 810 also testified that Coler was a supporter of the Nazi Party and their policies, and that he boastfully alluded to personally shooting Poles and Jews during Fall Weiss. Coler's superiors also thought of him as an ardent Nazi, "one who understood the National Socialist ideology," according to a 1943 report.
