= Fritz Heinemann (artist) =

German sculptor

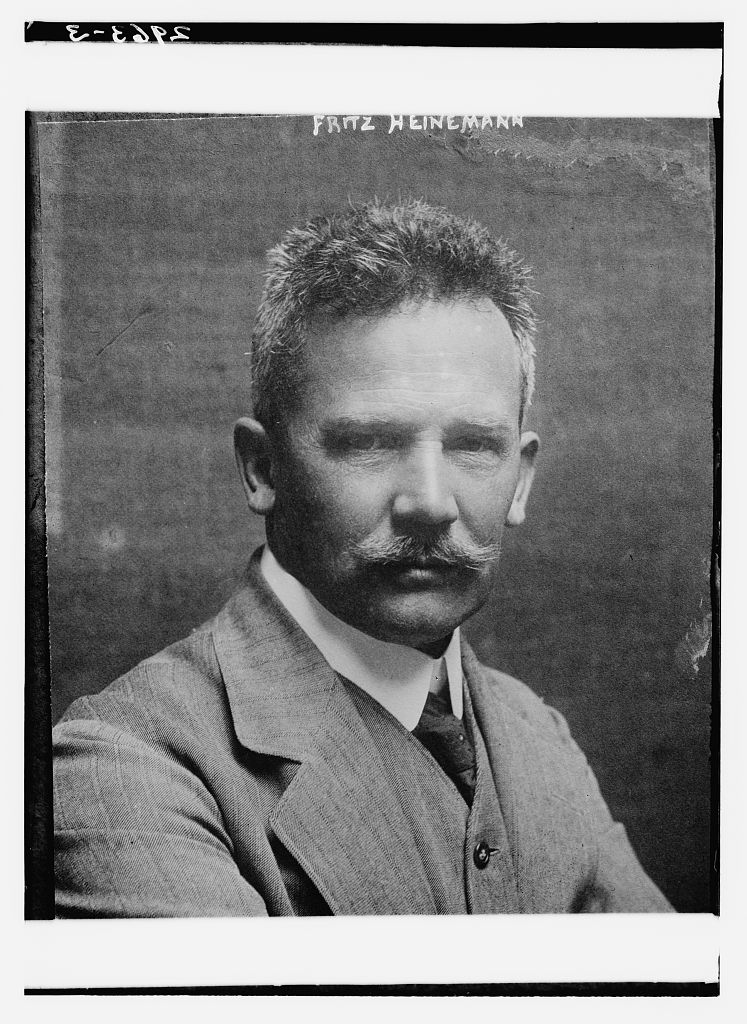

Fritz Heinemann (1 January 1864 - 1 December 1932) was a German sculptor.

== Biography ==
=== Birth ===
Heinemann was born on 1 January 1864 in Altena.

=== Family ===
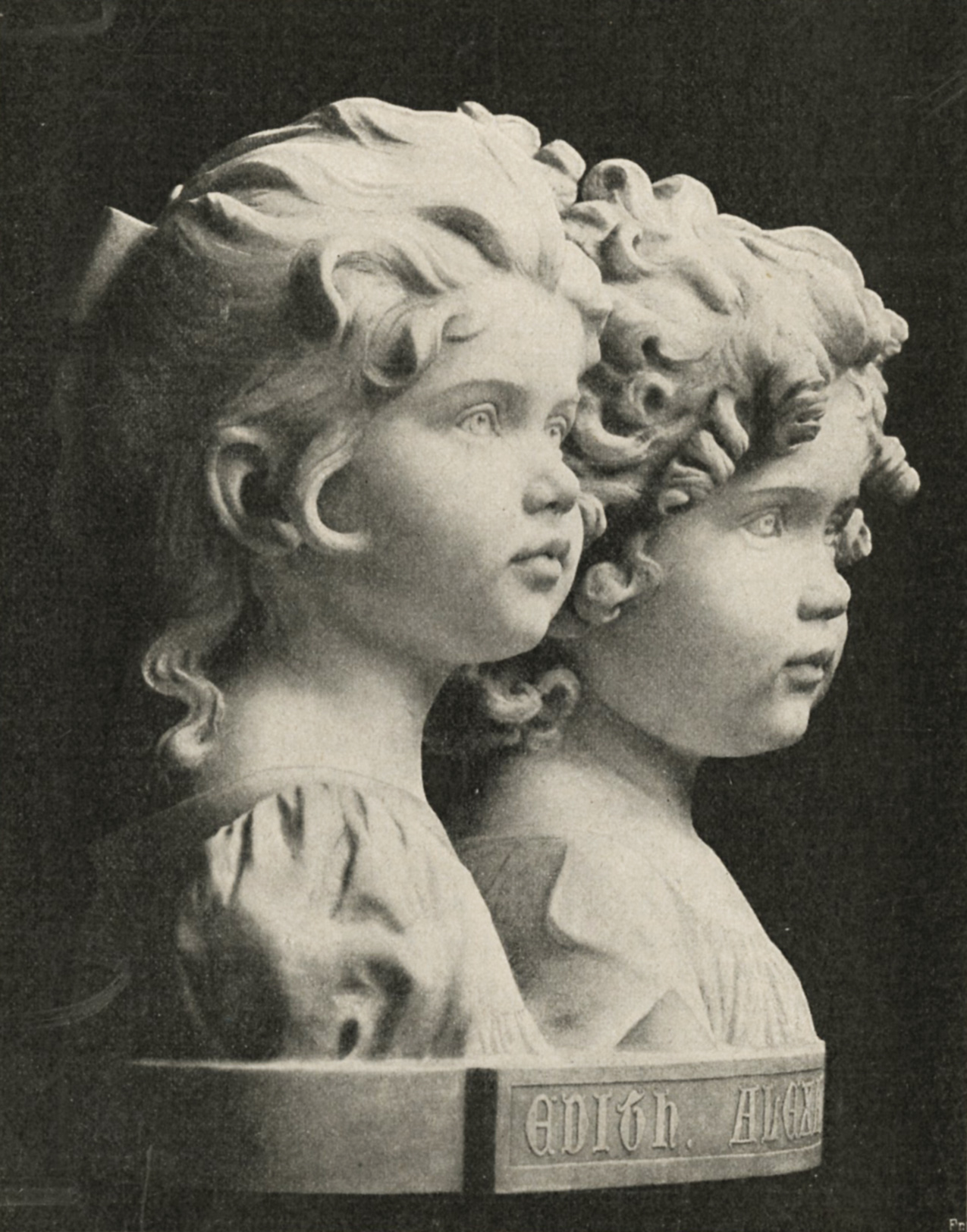
Sculpture of Edith and Alexandra Heinemann by Fritz Heinemann

Heinemann married the daughter of a wealthy cavalry officer from Nakel in the Province of Posen, and they had two children Edith and Alexandra. In 1902, Heinemann separated from his wife, who then married the sculptor, painter and graphic artist Karl Ludwig Manzel, whose circle of acquaintances included Kaiser Wilhelm II.

=== Death ===
Heinemann died on 1 December 1932 in Berlin.
