= Edith von Coler =

Nazi German propagandist and agent

Edith Von Coler
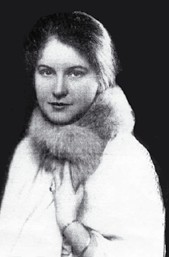
- Born: Edith Heinemann; 9 July 1895; Charlottenburg, German Empire
- Died: 14 May 1949 (aged 53); Pyrmont, Allied-occupied Germany
- Other name: Edit Von Coler
- Occupation: Journalist
- Known for: "Salon spying"
- Spouse: Ulrich von Coler
- Children: Jutta Schröder
- Parent(s): Fritz Heinemann, Alice Heinemann
- Espionage activity
- Country: Germany, Romania
- Allegiance: Nazi Germany
- Agency: Gestapo, German Foreign Office, Volksdeutsche Mittelstelle
- Service years: 1933–41

Edith von Coler (also: Edit Von Coler; née Edith Heinemann, 9 July 1895 – 14 May 1949) was a German propagandist and embassy employee who acted as an unofficial diplomatic conduit in the Kingdom of Romania before and during World War II.

Family connections brought Von Coler to the attention of the Nazi Party, leading to the German Foreign Office sending her to Romania. There, she helped to resolve infighting in the German community and helped to negotiate the 1939 German–Romanian Economic Treaty which subjugated Romania to Nazi Germany.

Later, after Von Coler incurred the displeasure of Joachim von Ribbentrop, he recalled her to Germany, ending her career as a Nazi agent. The Allies briefly interned her at the end of World War II, and she died in 1949.

Described in the Anglo-American press as a "femme fatale" and a "German Mata Hari", Von Coler's work for Germany was more complex – one journalist who knew her said she was "as remote from Mata Hari as a panzer division of 1942 is from the cavalry of 1914".

== Early life ==
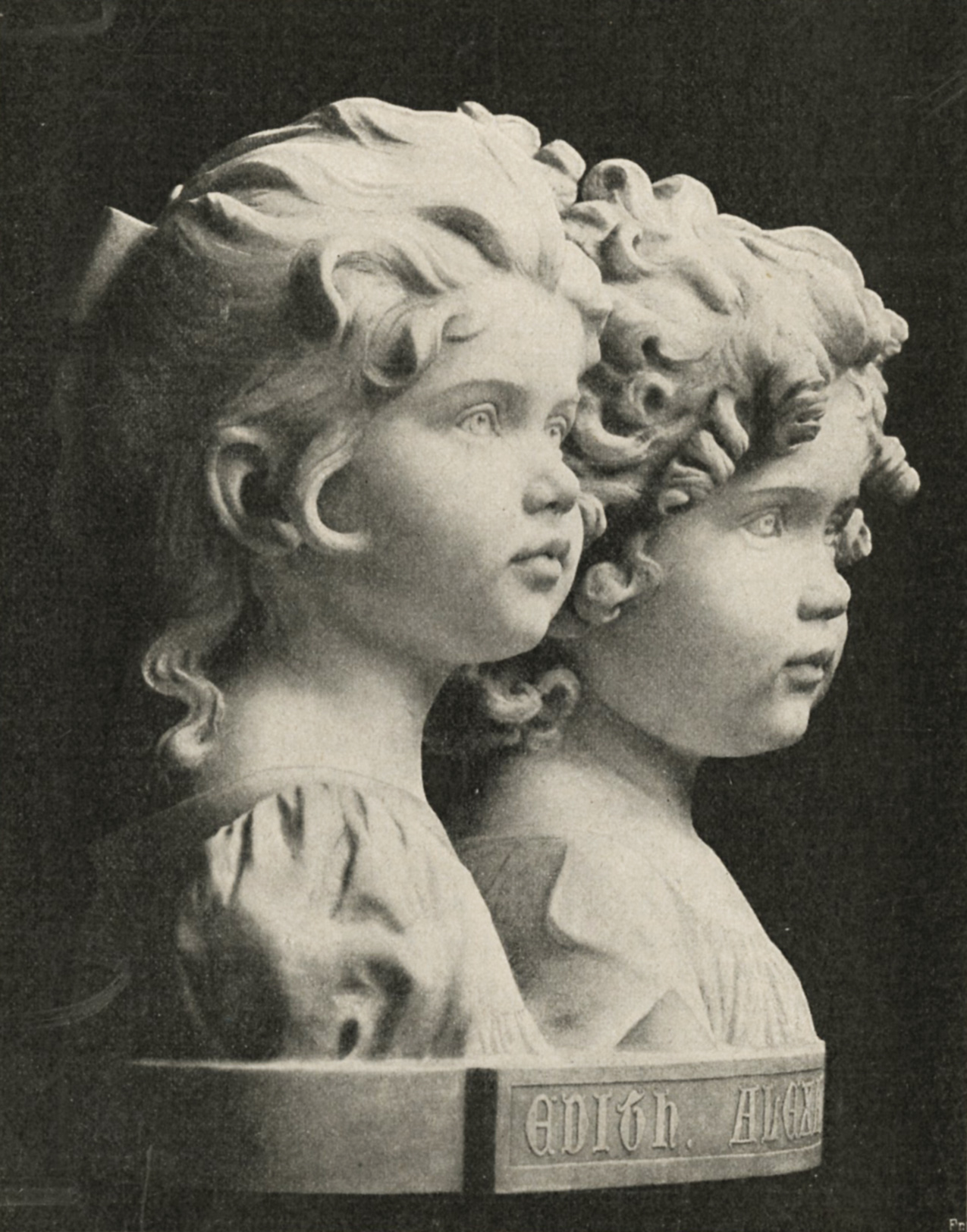
Sculpture of Edith and her sister Alexandra by Fritz Heinemann

Von Coler came from a wealthy, conservative family of artists. Her father was Fritz Heinemann, a successful German sculptor. Her mother, Alice Heinemann, was the daughter of a wealthy cavalry officer from Nakel in the Province of Posen. In 1902, her parents separated, and her mother then married the sculptor, painter and graphic artist Karl Ludwig Manzel, whose circle of acquaintances included Kaiser Wilhelm II.

In 1917, Von Coler entered into a marriage of convenience with Lieutenant Ulrich von Coler, later a colonel in the Wehrmacht and the Finnish Army. The couple separated in 1922, three years after the birth of their only daughter, Jutta.

== Rise in Nazi circles ==
Von Coler saw Germany as a humiliated victim of the Treaty of Versailles, leading to her joining the Nazi Party in May 1931. She was a cousin of Margarete Himmler, the wife of Reichsführer-SS Heinrich Himmler, and used this connection to gain influence in National Socialist circles. After she became the dramaturgical director of the Preußisches Staatstheater, it was rumored that she was the protegé of Hanns Johst, or Joseph Goebbels, and also that her theater work was only a cover for her to act as a "salon spy" for Himmler.

In March 1935, on the recommendation of Himmler, Von Coler became head of the foreign press under Richard Walther Darré, the head of the SS Race and Settlement Main Office.

== Activities in Romania ==
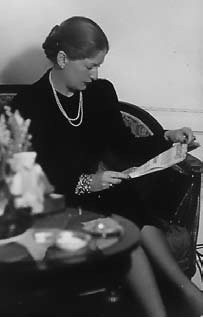
Edith von Coler in 1938

Francophile Romania, as a member of the Little Entente, was a regional power in southeastern Europe in the 1920s. Because of the geographical location of Romania and its oil reserves, Germany sought influence in the country.

At the request of the German Foreign Office, Darré sent Von Coler to Romania to distribute German-friendly articles. Besides this press activity, the embassy used her to convey sensitive information.

Although Von Coler's letterhead stated she was a "Clerk in the administration office of the Reichsbauernführer", it was widely believed that she was much more influential. It was rumoured that she was Himmler's sister and that she worked for the Volksdeutsche Mittelstelle. In addition, she was also believed to have letters of recommendation and funding from the German Foreign Office.

In Romania, Von Coler found a patron: the 54-year-old industrialist Nicolae Malaxa, who, as Romania's richest man, had a great influence on the press. Malaxa arranged a one-year contract for von Coler with the newspaper Curentul.

=== Reconciling pro-Nazi organizations ===
Von Coler had her first success in October 1938 when she resolved a dispute between Alfred Bonfert of the German People's Party of Romania and Fritz Fabritius of the Romanian German Community. On 26 October 1938, Von Coler met Fabritius and Helmut Wolff, chairman of the German People's Council for Transylvania. She spoke the next morning with Bonfert, the regional farmers' leader, Hans Kaufmes, and the district leader for Transylvania East, Waldemar Gust. That evening, the parties came to an agreement that Fabritius was the leader of the German community in Romania. Other organizations were dissolved and incorporated into the Romanian German Community. On 6 November, this "reconciliation" was celebrated with a mass rally in Timișoara.

Von Coler reported in November 1938 to Werner Lorenz, the head of the Volksdeutsche Mittelstelle, about the successful settlement of the dispute: "Both claim to be the true representatives of the new worldview ...". She asked Lorenz in September 1939 "to take energetic steps" as "The careless behavior of the ethnic Germans endangers our work... although they are no help due to their small number, they are of the greatest importance here ”.

=== Economic agreement with Romania ===
Although Von Coler officially worked as a journalist, she played a key role in preparing the German–Romanian Economic Treaty, which was signed on 23 March 1939, securing oil and grain exports from Romania to Germany. She described this as “the peaceful conquest of Romania”, "securing peace" and "peacefully gaining a real friend for Germany".

After the economic agreement, the Deuxième Bureau suspected Von Coler of being a Gestapo agent, and the British press referred to her as an "SS agent whose weapon is her looks." However, her large number of contacts also aroused the suspicion of the Gestapo, who suspected her of being a double agent.

=== Meeting with Carol II of Romania and recall ===
After the Battle of France, and the defeat of Romania's former ally, France, Romania no longer had the political strength to distance itself from Germany. In addition, the Soviet Union was threatening an attack if Romania did not cede northern Bukovina and Bessarabia to them. In late June 1940, the Romanian government gave in to a Soviet ultimatum and allowed Moscow to annex both Bessarabia and Northern Bukovina.

The Soviet occupation of Bessarabia and Northern Bukovina inspired Hungary to demand the return of Transylvania, but Hungarian-Romanian negotiations collapsed. Germany then forced Romania to accept Axis arbitration, resulting in the Second Vienna Award, the return of northeastern Transylvania to Hungary, the return of southern Dobruja to Bulgaria and the abdication of the Romanian king, Carol II, who went into exile.

Shortly before the abdication, Von Coler had a private audience with the king without the approval of the German embassy. Her unauthorized action and a perception that Von Coler was too sympathetic to the Romanians, annoyed her superiors in Bucharest and Berlin, and the Reich Minister for Foreign Affairs, Joachim von Ribbentrop recalled her. She left the country on 2 August 1940.

On her return, Von Coler's passport was taken away from her and she was forbidden to travel abroad until the end of the war, ending her career as a Nazi agent.

== Postwar internment and death ==
After the war, the Allies briefly interned Von Coler in Moosburg an der Isar, eventually releasing her after efforts by her daughter, Jutta Schröder. She died in May 1949.

== Reputation ==
In October 1943, the American magazine Coronet published an article by Bella Fromm entitled The Sirens of the Swastika. Fromm had known Von Coler when she was a journalist in Berlin from 1930 to 1938. In the article, she implied that Von Coler was a "femme fatale" who arranged the murder of a young attaché who fell for her, but came to suspect her of spying.

As press correspondent for the American newspaper Newsweek, R. G. Waldeck reported on her stay in Bucharest from June 1940 to January 1941. In her book Athenée Palace, she devoted an entire chapter to Von Coler with the title The Fifth Column. In the chapter, Waldeck stated: "Everyone at the Athenée Palace considered Frau Von Color a Mata Hari, 1940 fashion, a simplification that made everyone happy. But actually, Frau von Coler was as remote from Mata Hari as a panzer division of 1942 is from the cavalry of 1914." Waldeck said Von Coler "was not Hitler's spy but Hitler's propagandist. Her task was infinitely more complex than the task of a spy and conceived in a much more realistic vein. Seduction was no longer enough. The propagandist had to combine the diplomatic genius of a Jules Cambon with the salonist talents of a Récamier."

The historian Paul Milata stated: "Her trump card, however, was glamor and the talent to negotiate successfully, quickly and, above all, discreetly. To this day, most Germans in Romania do not understand that they were brought into line as early as 1938 and not only in September 1940 with the appointment of Andreas Schmidt as ethnic group leader; this was only their most visible consequence. Von Coler's communication style was so successful that she was never remembered then or until now."

== See also ==
- Stephanie von Hohenlohe — a similar agent of influence for Germany but in the UK and USA.
