= Julius A. Coller House =

- U.S. National Register of Historic Places
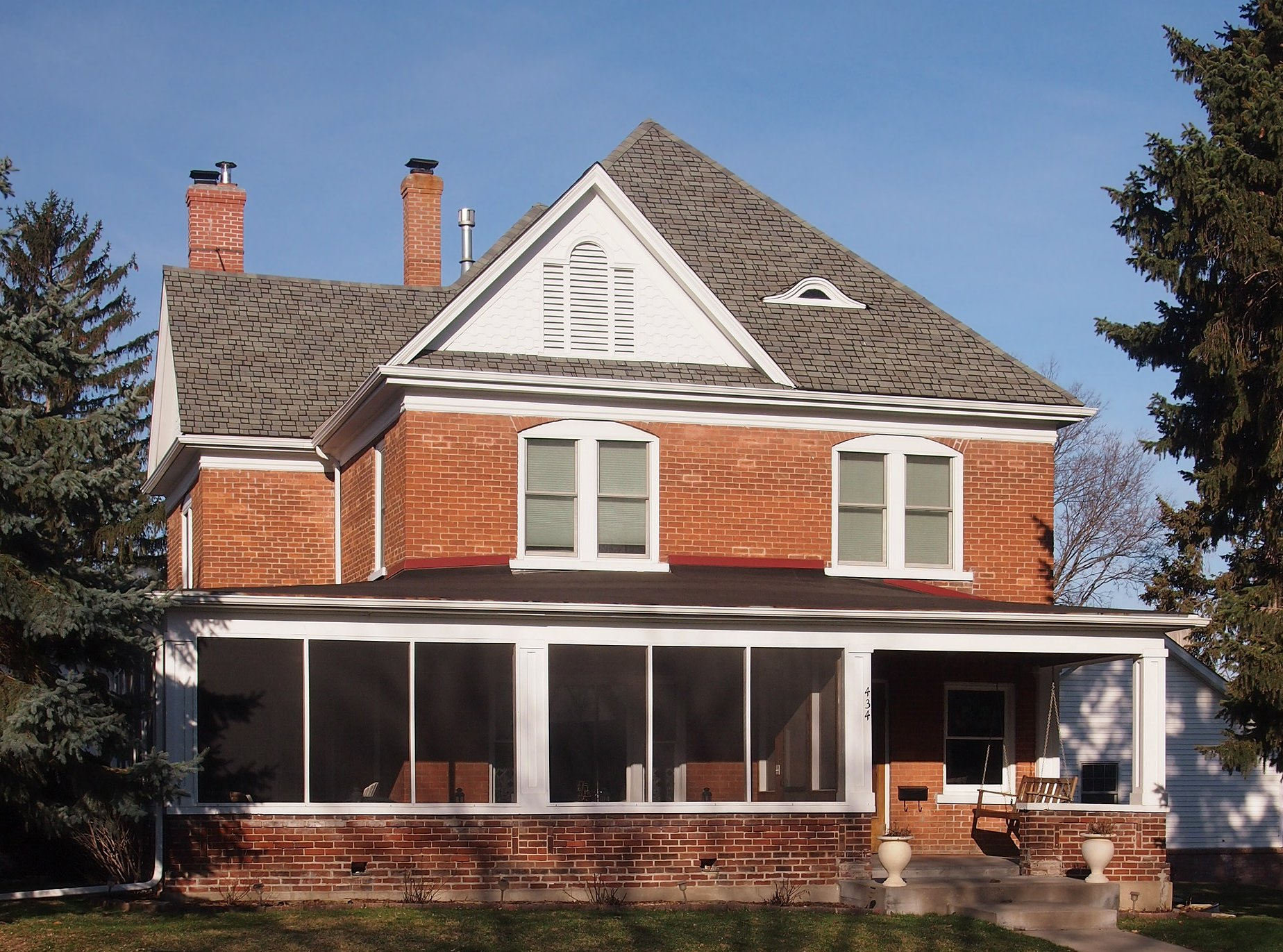
- The Julius A. Coller House from the east

- Location within Minnesota Location within the United States
- Location: 434 S. Lewis Street, Shakopee, Minnesota
- Coordinates: 44°47′41.5″N 93°31′29″W
- Area: Less than 1 acre (0.40 ha)
- Built: 1887
- MPS: Scott County MRA
- NRHP reference No.: 80002168
- Added to NRHP: April 17, 1980

The Julius A. Coller House is a historic house in Shakopee, Minnesota, United States. It was built in 1887 for Julius A. Coller I (1859–1940), a lawyer and Democratic politician who served four terms in the Minnesota Senate. The house was listed on the National Register of Historic Places in 1980 for its significance in the themes of architecture and politics/government. It was nominated for its association with Coller, one of the leading citizens of his generation in Shakopee, and for being one of the best preserved houses from the period when the city took on a prominent role as seat of Scott County.

== Description ==
The Julius A. Coller House stands on a corner lot in a residential neighborhood. It rises two and a half stories, with irregular massing, in red brick with white wood trim. Its hip roof has a gable on each façade and an eyebrow dormer in line with the front door. A screened porch wraps around the front and south side of the house.

== History ==
The house was built in 1887. Coller served 10 years as Shakopee's city recorder, nine years as the clerk of the Scott County District Court, and four years as county attorney. He was first elected to the Minnesota Senate in 1898. Coller had the roof of the house raised around 1900. He finished his fourth term as state senator in January 1915, having played a key role in getting Minnesota's first women's prison (now the Minnesota Correctional Facility – Shakopee) located in the city. He had the wraparound porch added to the house around 1915, followed by an attached garage at the rear about 10 years later. Coller served on the University of Minnesota Board of Regents from 1924 to 1937. His son Julias A. Coller II became a prominent attorney in Shakopee, wrote a history of the city, and was still living in the house when its National Register nomination was being prepared in 1980. A 1938 New Deal-funded mural in what was then the Shakopee High School (now the Central Family Center) includes a depiction of the senior Coller speaking to James J. Hill while a young Coller II eats an ice cream cone.

== See also ==
- National Register of Historic Places listings in Scott County, Minnesota
