= Ned Colfer =

Irish hurler

Personal information
- Native name: Éamonn Coilféir (Irish)
- Born: 1940 (age 85–86) New Ross, County Wexford, Ireland
- Occupation: Farmer
- Height: 5 ft 8 in (173 cm)

Sport
- Sport: Hurling
- Position: Left corner-back
Club
- Years: Club
- 1958-1970: Geraldine O'Hanrahans
Club titles
- Wexford titles: 1
Inter-county
- Years: County
- 1959-1970: Wexford
Inter-county titles
- Leinster titles: 4
- All-Irelands: 1
- NFL: 1

Ned Colfer (born 1940) is an Irish retired sportsperson. He played hurling with his local club Geraldine O'Hanrahan's and was a member of the Wexford senior inter-county team in the 1960s and 1970s.

== Honours ==
Geraldine O'Hanrahans

- Wexford Senior Hurling Championship: 1966
- Wexford Junior Football Championship: 1963

Wexford

- All-Ireland Senior Hurling Championship: 1968
- Leinster Senior Hurling Championship: 1962, 1965, 1968, 1970
- National Hurling League: 1966–67
