= Sunnersberg =

- Municipality
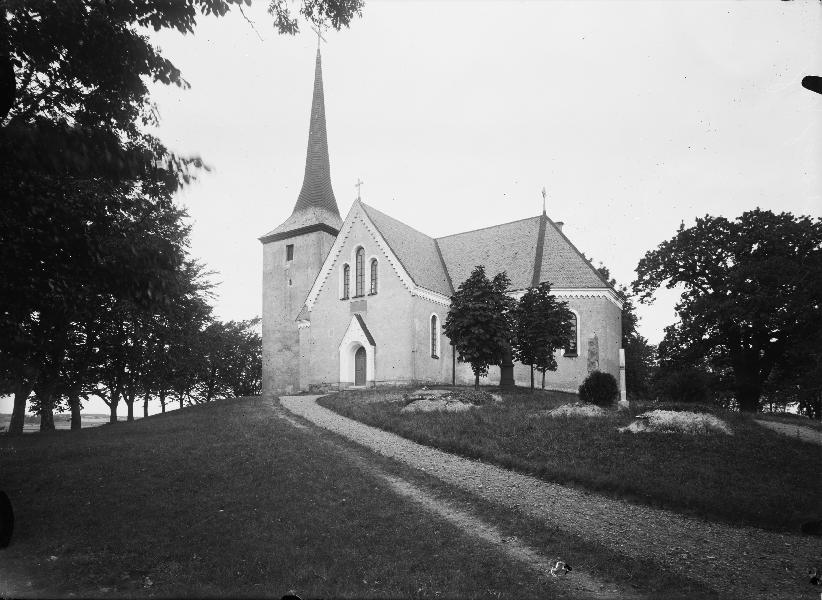
- Sunnersberg church (Photo by Anders Roland 20 February 2012)

- Location within Sweden
- Coordinates: 58°34′0″N 13°7′0″E
- Country: Sweden
- County: Skaraborg County
- Province: Västergötland
- Time zone: UTC+1 (CET)
  - Summer (DST): UTC+2 (CEST)

Sunnersberg Municipality was a municipality in the county of Skaraborg in Sweden. The municipality was established in Sunnersberg parish in the Kålland district in Västergötland when the 1862 municipal regulations came into force. In the municipal reform of 1952 it became a commune in the North Kålland rural municipality, and in 1969 it was made part of Lidköping Municipality. It lies on the south shore of Lake Vänern.
