= Terence Colfer =

- Born: Ottawa, Ontario
- Military career
- Allegiance: Canada
- Branch: Canadian Forces
- Rank: Ambassador
- Commands: Chief of the Defense Staff
- Other work: Ambassador

Terence Colfer is a Canadian civil administrator, and diplomat.

== Beginnings ==
Terence Colfer earned a Bachelor of Arts in Political Science at the Royal Military College of Canada in Kingston, Ontario in 1965, student # 6523.

He served in the Canadian Forces as an officer cadet from 1961 to 1965 and served as an officer from 1965 to 1969. He served abroad in the Middle East.

== Civilian career ==
He joined the Department of Industry, Trade and Commerce as a Trade Commissioner in 1969. He served abroad in Rome, Italy, Dallas, Texas, Sydney, Australia, Detroit, Michigan and in Boston, Massachusetts as Deputy Consul General and Senior Trade Commissioner from 1990 to 1994. In Ottawa, Ontario he undertook a variety of assignments, including:

- Director, Overseas Division, from 1987 to 1988;
- Director, United States Trade and Tourism Development Division, from 1988 to 1990; and
- from 1994 to 1996, Director, South Asia Division. *

Mr. Colfer served as:

- Ambassador to Kuwait from 1996 to 1999, and
- Ambassador to the Islamic Republic of Iran from 1999 to 2001. He retired from the Department of Foreign Affairs in 2003.

== Personal life ==
He is married to Lynn Colfer and they have three sons.
