= Ray Coller =

Australian rules footballer, born 1907

Personal information
- Full name: Ray Coller
- Born: 31 March 1907
- Died: 2 April 1969 (aged 62)
- Original team: Glenelg

Playing career^{1}
Years	Club	Games (Goals)
1932	Fitzroy	4 (2)
- ^{1} Playing statistics correct to the end of 1932.

Ray Coller (31 March 1907 – 2 April 1969) was an Australian rules footballer who played with Fitzroy in the Victorian Football League (VFL).
