= Julius A. Coller =

American lawyer and politician

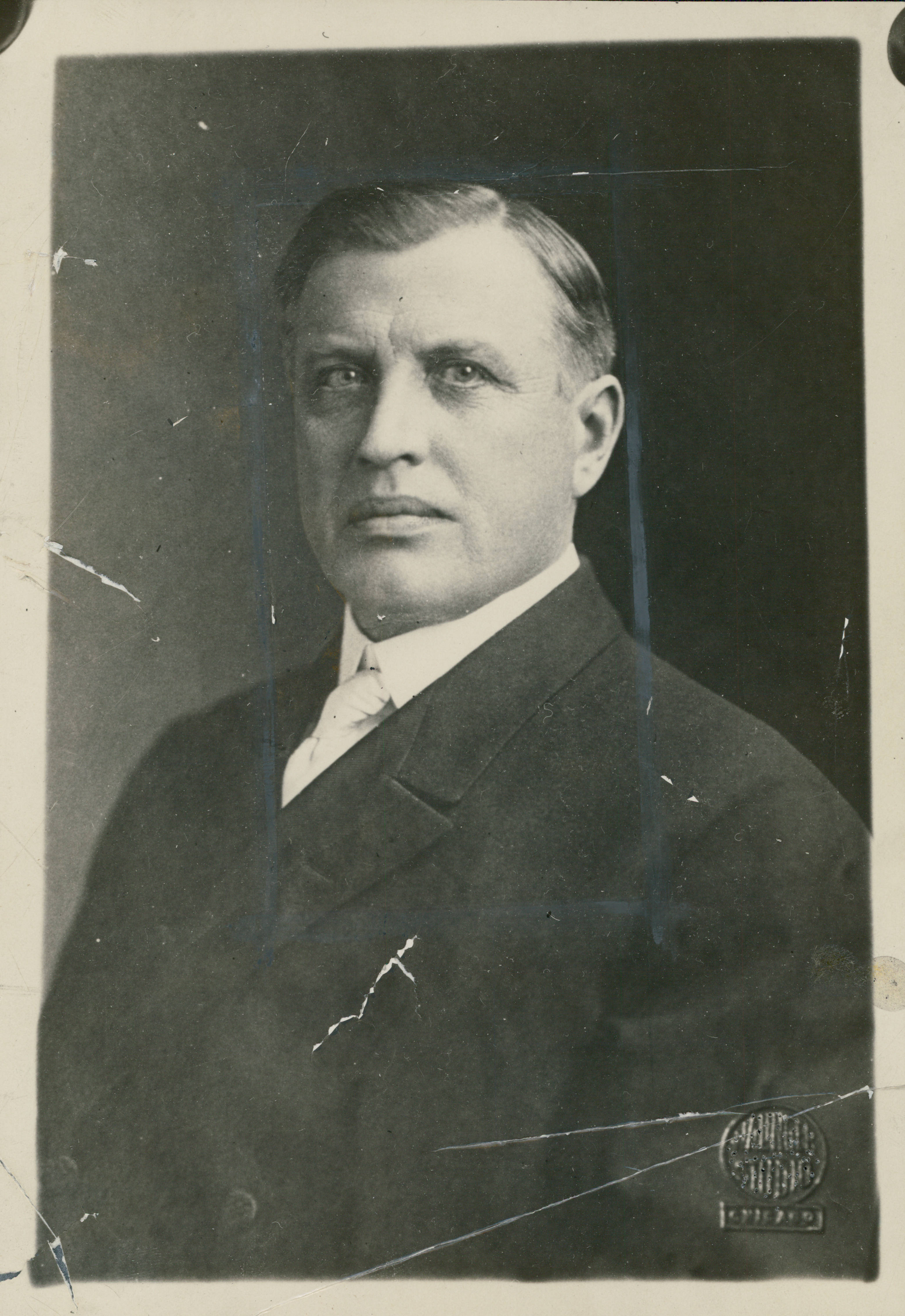
Julius Coller

Julius Anthony Coller (February 22, 1859 – August 15, 1940) was an American lawyer and politician.

Coller was born in Shakopee, Scott County, Minnesota and was an attorney. He lived in Shakopee with his wife. He served as the Scott County Attorney and District Court Clerk. Coller also served as the Shakopee City Recorder and also served on the University of Minnesota Board of Regents. Coller served in the Minnesota Senate from 1899 to 1914 and was a Democrat.

== See also ==
- Julius A. Coller House
