= German–Romanian Treaty for the Development of Economic Relations between the Two Countries =

1939 treaty between Germany and Romania

German–Romanian Economic Treaty
German–Romanian Treaty for the Development of Economic Relations between the Two Countries
- Signed: March 23, 1939
- Location: Bucharest, Romania
- Signatories: Germany; Romania
- Languages: German and Romanian

The German-Romanian Treaty for the Development of Economic Relations between the Two Countries was a bilateral economic agreement signed between the German and the Romanian governments in Bucharest on 23 March 1939. The agreement established German control over most aspects of Romanian economy, and thus forcing the Romanian government to join the Axis powers at a later date. According to a contemporary report by Time magazine, "in no instance of modern times has one State made such humiliating, far-reaching economic concessions to another" as Romania to Germany, the same publication considering that it transformed Romania into a "German dependency".

Ratifications were exchanged in Berlin on 20 December 1939, and the agreement became effective on 20 January 1940. It was registered in League of Nations Treaty Series on 17 January 1940.

== Background ==
In late 1938 and early 1939, the German government under Hitler was carrying out some of its plans for territorial changes in Europe, which gave the German Reich more land for economic expansion. As part of that process, Czechoslovakia was overrun on 15 March 1939. In addition, the German government coveted the oil-fields of Romania, and desired to secure Romanian military cooperation in case of war.

== Terms of the agreement ==
The agreement provided for delivery of various Romanian goods to Germany in the fields of agriculture, timber and oil. In exchange, the German government undertook to supply the Romanian government with technical know-how and military equipment which might be required. The agreement also gave trade benefits to German companies in Romania, in the form of free trade zones. The agreement was designated for a period of ten years, with the possibility of extension.

== Aftermath ==
The agreement strengthened the Third Reich economically and placed at its disposal the resources of Romania at a time Hitler was planning to invade Poland. The British government was alarmed by that development, and on 13 April 1939 committed itself to the defense of Romania from German aggressive designs on its sovereignty. However, the Romanian government assessed that British support will not be effective, and this evaluation seemed even more realistic following the German occupation of Poland in September 1939 and France in May–June 1940, and British withdrawal from the continent at the same time. As a result, the Romanian government decided to cooperate with the German government and on 23 November 1940 joined the Axis powers.
