= Lockstedt =

- Municipality
- Coat of arms

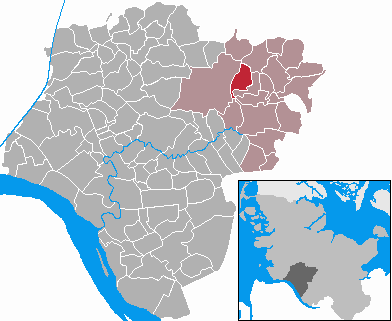
- Location of Lockstedt within Steinburg district
- Interactive map of Lockstedt
- Location within Germany Location within Schleswig-Holstein
- Coordinates: 54°0′N 9°41′E
- Country: Germany
- State: Schleswig-Holstein
- District: Steinburg
- Municipal assoc.: Kellinghusen

Government
  - Mayor: Klaus Rühmann

Area
  - Total: 7.32 km^{2} (2.83 sq mi)
- Elevation: 28 m (92 ft)

Population (2025-12-31)
  - Total: 156
  - Density: 21.3/km^{2} (55.2/sq mi)
- Time zone: UTC+01:00 (CET)
  - Summer (DST): UTC+02:00 (CEST)
- Postal codes: 25551
- Dialling codes: 04826, 04877
- Vehicle registration: IZ
- Website: www.amt-hohenlockstedt.de

Lockstedt (German: [ˈlɔk.ʃteːt]; Low German: Locksteed) is a municipality in the district of Steinburg, in Schleswig-Holstein, Germany. It has a population of 146 as of 2022 and lies in proximity to several nearby towns, including Hohenlockstedt, Kellinghusen, and Meezen.
