= Pekkala =

Pekkala is a Finnish surname. Notable people with the surname include:

- Ahti Pekkala (1924–2014), Finnish politician
- Eino Pekkala (1887–1956), Finnish politician
- Mary Pekkala (1889–1975), British-born Finnish civil rights activist
- Mauno Pekkala (1890–1952), Finnish politician
- Tomi Pekkala (born 1988), Finnish ice-hockey player
- Vilho Pekkala (1898–1974), Finnish wrestler
