= Mary Rhodes Moorhouse-Pekkala =

Finnish patronage and civil rights activist (1889–1975)

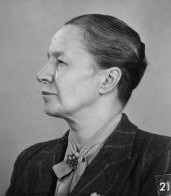
- Born: Mary Rhodes Moorhouse; 4 September 1889; Oxon Hoath, United Kingdom
- Died: 5 March 1975 (aged 85); Helsinki, Finland
- Citizenship: United Kingdom; Finland
- Education: Victoria University of Manchester
- Occupation: Civil rights activist
- Spouse: Eino Pekkala (m. 1928; died 1956)
- Relatives: William Barnard Rhodes (grandfather); William Barnard Rhodes-Moorhouse (brother)

Mary Rhodes Moorhouse-Pekkala (4 September 1889 – 5 March 1975) was a British-born Finnish patronage and civil rights activist, who was an heiress to a wealthy New Zealand-British family. In the early 1920s, she was active in the Communist Party of Great Britain and the Comintern. Moorhouse emigrated to Finland in 1928 after marrying the Finnish Socialist politician Eino Pekkala. She was one of the major financiers of the 1930s Finnish cultural left, and a prominent civil rights activist.

== Life ==
=== Background ===
Mary Rhodes Moorhouse was born in the Oxon Hoath Manor in Tonbridge and Malling, Kent, to the family of Edward Moorhouse (1834–1917) and Mary Ann Rhodes (1851–1930). Her grandfather was the New Zealand businessman William Barnard Rhodes, and grandmother Otahi, a Māori from the Wellington area. Edward Moorhouse and Mary Ann Rhodes moved to England in 1883 and had four children. Mary Rhodes Moorhouse's eldest brother was the Royal Flying Corps lieutenant William Barnard Rhodes-Moorhouse who was killed in the World War I.

=== Early years ===
Moorhouse studied at the Victoria University of Manchester. She was a guild socialist who was active in the Manchester Communist Guild Group. In December 1919, Moorhouse, Rajani Palme Dutt and Ellen Wilkinson participated the international student socialist conference in Geneva as the representatives of the University Socialist Federation. In July 1920, she was Guild Group's delegate in the Communist Unity Convention in London which was the founding congress of the Communist Party of Great Britain.

Moorhouse worked for the Communist Party as the press officer of the Woman's National Committee. In London, she was associated with the Estonian communist Salme Murrik, who was married to Finnish socialist Eino Pekkala. In the summer of 1921, Moorhouse had a short relationship with the Finnish poet Elmer Diktonius who visited Britain to see Murrik. In 1922, Moorhouse, Murrik and Palme Dutt were sent to Stockholm as Comintern representatives. Murrik introduced Moorhouse to her husband in July 1923. Pekkala and Murrik were already separated, but their divorce was not made official until January 1924. Moorhouse visited Pekkala for the first time in August 1924, and in 1925, they got engaged. For the next three years Moorhouse, Murrik and Palme Dutt worked for Comintern in Brussels. In addition to her political work, she wrote poems which were published in the German magazine Die Rote Fahne and the French L'Humanité. Moorhouse and Pekkala were married in March 1928. Moorhouse was now granted Finnish citizenship, and she moved to Helsinki.

=== Life in Finland ===
Moorhouse became one of the major financiers of the Finnish cultural left. She was also active in the civil rights movement, Moorhouse and the professor Väinö Lassila were the most prominent figures of the Finnish popular front fighting for human rights and opposing fascism. She funded the author Erkki Vala, who published the magazine Tulenkantajat (″The Flame Bearers″) which had campaigns against the 1935 sterilization law and the capital punishment of Toivo Antikainen.

In 1930, Eino Pekkala was given a 3-year sentence because of his political activities. Moorhouse now founded the organization ″Vankien Apu″ (Prisoner's Aid) to help political prisoners and their families. The organization was financed by her personal properties and fundraising, the Finnish section of the International Red Aid, and the Swedish syndicalist union SAC which raised one-third of the money. In July 1933, Eino Pekkala took part on a hunger strike in the Tammisaari forced labour camp. The strike, causing the death of five prisoners on forced feeding, and the abuse of political prisoners came to international awareness as Moorhouse met the Danish author Martin Andersen Nexø who wrote an article of the case. Although her organization was disbanded in January 1934, Moorhouse still continued her work with privately hired assistants. The Tammisaari camp was finally closed in 1937 because of the international pressure.

In the early 1940, Moorhouse and Hella Wuolijoki visited Bertolt Brecht who was living in exile in Stockholm. Wuolijoki invited Brecht to Helsinki, where he lived until Finland sided with the Nazi Germany in June 1941.

Moorhouse was under surveillance of the intelligence services of Great Britain, Finland, Sweden, Estonia and Belgium. During the World War II, she was a contact person between Hella Wuolijoki and the Soviet secret service NKVD. According to the documents revealed by the United States National Security Agency, Moorhouse was arrested for suspected espionage in 1942 in Stockholm.

After the World War II, the political situation in Finland changed. The Communist organizations were legalized, and Eino Pekkala was a member of the Cabinet of Finland. Mary Moorhouse focused on her work in various human rights, women's rights and peace organizations. She was active in the League for Human Rights and Civil Liberties, and was the chairwoman of the Finnish section of the Women's International League for Peace and Freedom.

== Family ==
Eino Pekkala's and Mary Moorhouse's daughter Salme Anne Pekkala was born in 1928. She was married to the Finnish diplomat Risto Hyvärinen.
