= Lassila (surname) =

Lassila is a Finnish surname. Notable people with the surname include:

- Carolus Lassila, Finnish diplomat
- Kalle Lassila, Finnish cross country skier
- Lydia Lassila, Australian freestyle skier
- Ora Lassila, Finnish computer scientist
- Teemu Lassila, Finnish ice hockey player
- Väinö Lassila, Finnish physician, anatomist, anthropologist and human rights activist
- Algot Untola (pen name Maiju Lassila), Finnish writer and journalist
