= Mark Peel =

Mark Peel may refer to:

- Mark Peel (historian)
- Mark Peel (chef)
