= Tauno =

- Gender: Male

Origin
- Region of origin: Estonia, Finland

Other names
- Related names: Augustine

Tauno is a masculine given name, a variation of Augustine, found most commonly in Estonia and Finland. Tauno may refer to:

- Tauno Hannikainen (1896–1968), Finnish cellist and conductor
- Tauno Honkanen (1927–2023), Finnish skier and Olympic competitor
- Tauno Ilmoniemi (1893–1934), Finnish gymnast and diver and Olympic competitor
- Tauno Kangro (born 1966), Estonian sculptor
- Tauno Käyhkö (born 1950) Finnish ski jumper and Olympic competitor
- Tauno Kovanen (1917–1986), Finnish wrestler and Olympic medalist
- Tauno Lampola (1903–1969), Finnish modern pentathlete and Olympic competitor
- Tauno Lappalainen (1898–1973), Finnish cross country skier and Olympic competitor
- Tauno Luiro (1932–1955), Finnish ski jumper and Olympic competitor
- Tauno Mäki (1912–1983), Finnish sport shooter and Olympic medalist
- Tauno Marttinen (1912–2008), Finnish composer
- Tauno Nurmi (1922–2014), Finnish motorcycle racing driver
- Tauno Palo (1908–1982), Finnish actor and singer
- Tauno Sipilä (1921–2001), Finnish cross country skier and Olympic competitor
- Tauno Söder (1927–2009), Finnish television and film actor
- Tauno Tiusanen (born 1941), Finnish professor emeritus of University of Glasgow and Lappeenranta University of Technology
