= William Barnard Rhodes =

New Zealand landowner and merchant (1807–1878)

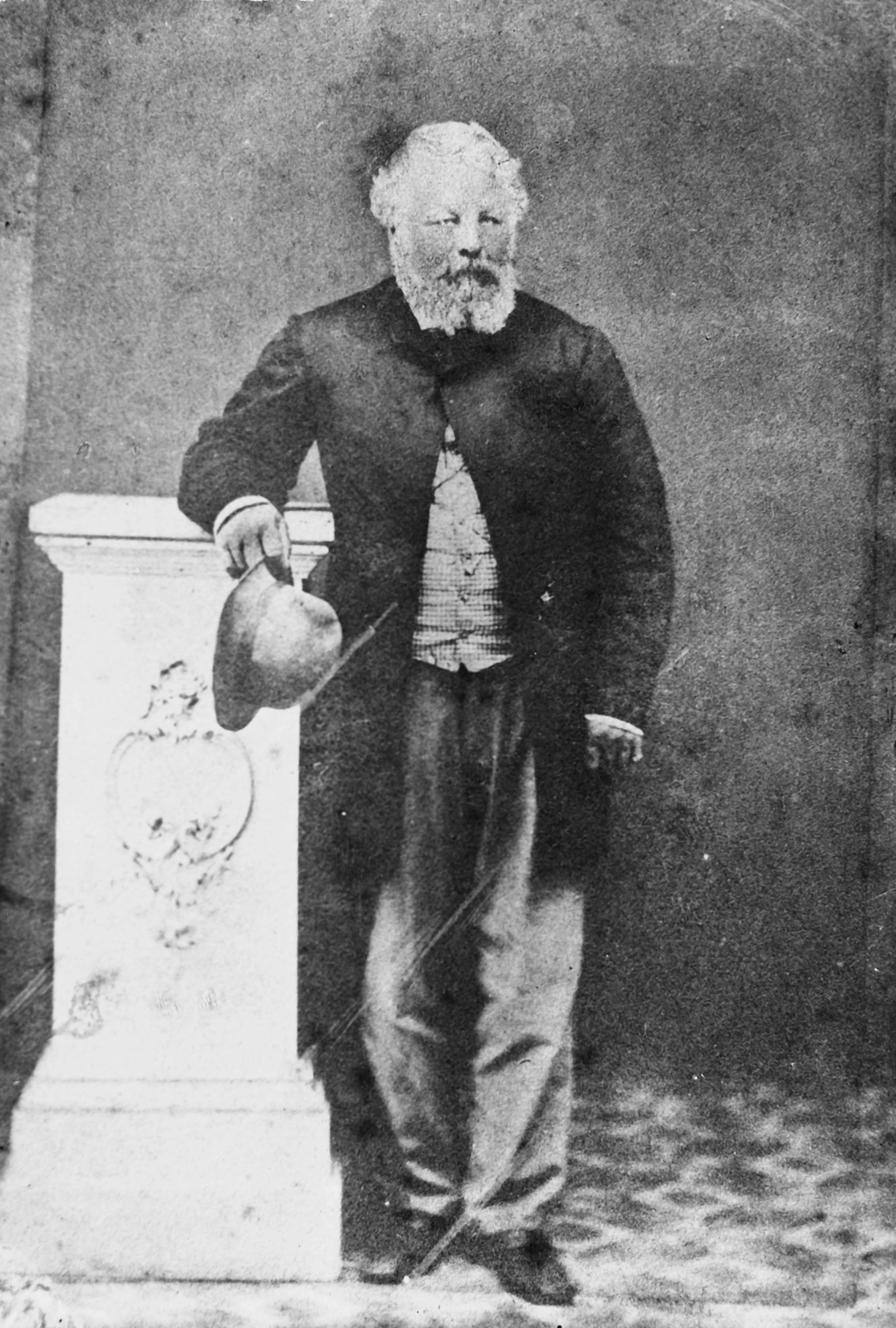
- William Barnard Rhodes, circa 1870s

Member of the New Zealand Parliament for Wellington Country
- In office 18 August 1853 – 15 September 1855

Member of the New Zealand Parliament for City of Wellington
- In office 27 July 1858 – 27 January 1866

Personal details
- Born: 1807? England
- Died: 11 February 1878
- Spouse(s): Sarah King (died 1862); Sarah Ann Moorhouse
- Relations: William Barnard Rhodes-Moorhouse (grandson); Mary Rhodes Moorhouse-Pekkala (granddaughter); —; Robert Heaton Rhodes (brother); George Rhodes (brother); Joseph Rhodes (brother); —; Heaton Rhodes (nephew); Arthur Rhodes (nephew); —; William Sefton Moorhouse (brother-in-law)
- Children: Mary Ann Rhodes
- Profession: Merchant and pastoralist

William Barnard Rhodes (1807? – 11 February 1878), casually referred to as Barney Rhodes, was a New Zealand landowner, pastoralist, businessman and politician. He was probably born in Lincolnshire, England, but took up a career at sea at an early age. In 1839 he settled in Wellington, New Zealand and remained there for the rest of his life. He brought three of his younger brothers to New Zealand and they co-ordinated their efforts.

A tough man having "shrewd judgement, unflagging energy and sheer determination" his frugal ways and his personal engagement in physical labour deferred social acceptance by the new colony's social élite. Nevertheless, he used these talents to make himself a rich man and with his three brothers all four became major landowners and pastoralists in the North and in the South Island.

When he died in Wellington he was described as one of the richest people in the country.

== Early life ==
Barnard Rhodes was the eldest of eleven surviving children of William Rhodes, a wealthy tenant farmer born in Yorkshire, and his wife, Theodosia Maria Heaton. He was baptised on 9 May 1807 at Epworth, Lincolnshire, England. At the time of his death it was suggested he was rather older than his announced 70 years.

He was a second officer on a merchant vessel by 1826 and by 1831 he had his own command. After visiting South America, Africa, and India, Rhodes ended up in New South Wales where he was able to make substantial pastoral investments. Rhodes seems to have first visited New Zealand on a whaling expedition commanding the barque Australian for Sydney NSW business, Cooper and Holt later Holt and Roberts. During that time he arranged A B Smith and Co of Sydney to be his (stock and station) agents to look after his entire property in the colony of New South Wales.

In September 1836, as captain of the barque Australian, he climbed the Port Hills from Lyttelton Harbour and looking over the area now occupied by the city of Christchurch he observed a large grassy plain with two small areas of forest. He reported that "All the land that I saw was swamp and mostly covered with water".

== Major landowner ==
In late 1839, in partnership with the mercantile firm of Daniel Cooper and James Holt, he went back to New Zealand to acquire land for cattle runs and set up trading stations. He acquired deeds to nearly two million acres. For the trading stations he placed agents and stock-in-trade at carefully chosen landings. For his own base he chose Wellington and in late 1840 built his premises in Te Aro and completed his wharf, Wellington's first, the following year. (Note: In January 2018 this site bounded by Bond Street (was Old Customhouse Street and before that beach) and Victoria Street (the short section previously Farish Street) is undergoing an archaeological dig) Rhodes lived by the eastern corner of the junction of Cuba Street and Manners Street. He bought out Cooper and Holt's share in 1850.

Though his claims to the near two million acres were largely disallowed his 30,000 acres Heaton Park estate at Bulls had been a component. It is thought his acquisition of another 80,000 acres in the North Island could be an underestimate and to that should be added another 100,000 acres of grazing rights. Later, along with his younger brothers, their South Island estates stretched from Banks Peninsula to Otago. With similar holdings in the Hawkes Bay – East Coast regions they together controlled, by the 1850s, exceeding 300,000 acres.

== W B Rhodes and Co ==
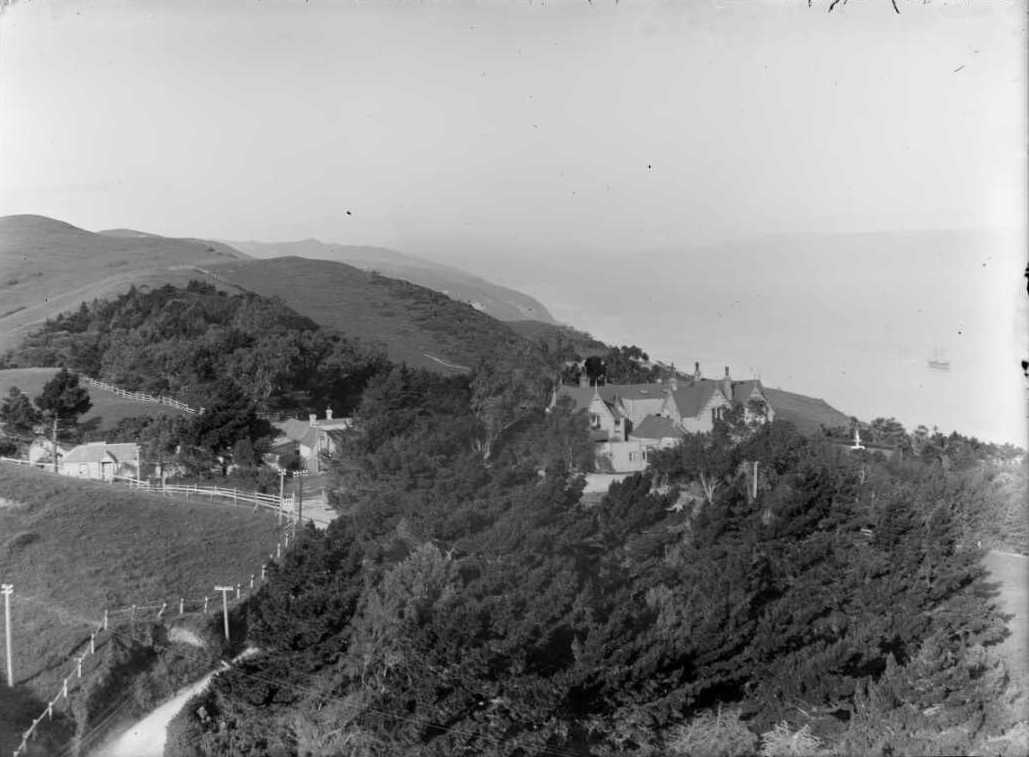
Rhodes' house, The Grange

In addition to supplying imported livestock and goods of all kinds including liquor to settlers he held the contract to supply troops, the "Hickety Pips". He shipped out his own wool and rapidly obtained the agencies for the major shipping companies. By the 1850s he was not only an insurance agent but a substantial financier. He helped found The New Zealand Shipping Company, New Zealand Insurance and The Bank of New Zealand.

== Highland Park ==
Rhodes bought his Wellington sheep run from the original holders in 1849 and in 1865 built the driveway now known as Wadestown Road for access to his new house there, The Grange. After his widow's death it became the residence of Sir Harold Beauchamp, father of Katherine Mansfield and, in stages, the former sheep run was subdivided into sites for houses.

== Politics ==
New Zealand Parliament
Years	Term	Electorate	Party
1853–1855	1st	Wellington Country	Independent
1858–1860	2nd	City of Wellington	Independent
1860–1866	3rd	City of Wellington	Independent

As a result of his prominence in the national community he decided to enter politics. He served on the Wellington Provincial Council, where he was a strong supporter of Isaac Featherston.

He was then elected to the 1st New Zealand Parliament as the representative for the Wellington Country seat, covering Miramar, Mākara, Porirua, the Kāpiti Coast and Horowhenua, from 1853 to 1855. From 1858 he represented the City of Wellington electorate in the 2nd Parliament and the 3rd Parliament, but failed to win re-election in 1866. He was later appointed to the Legislative Council.

== Family ==
=== Wives and his daughter ===
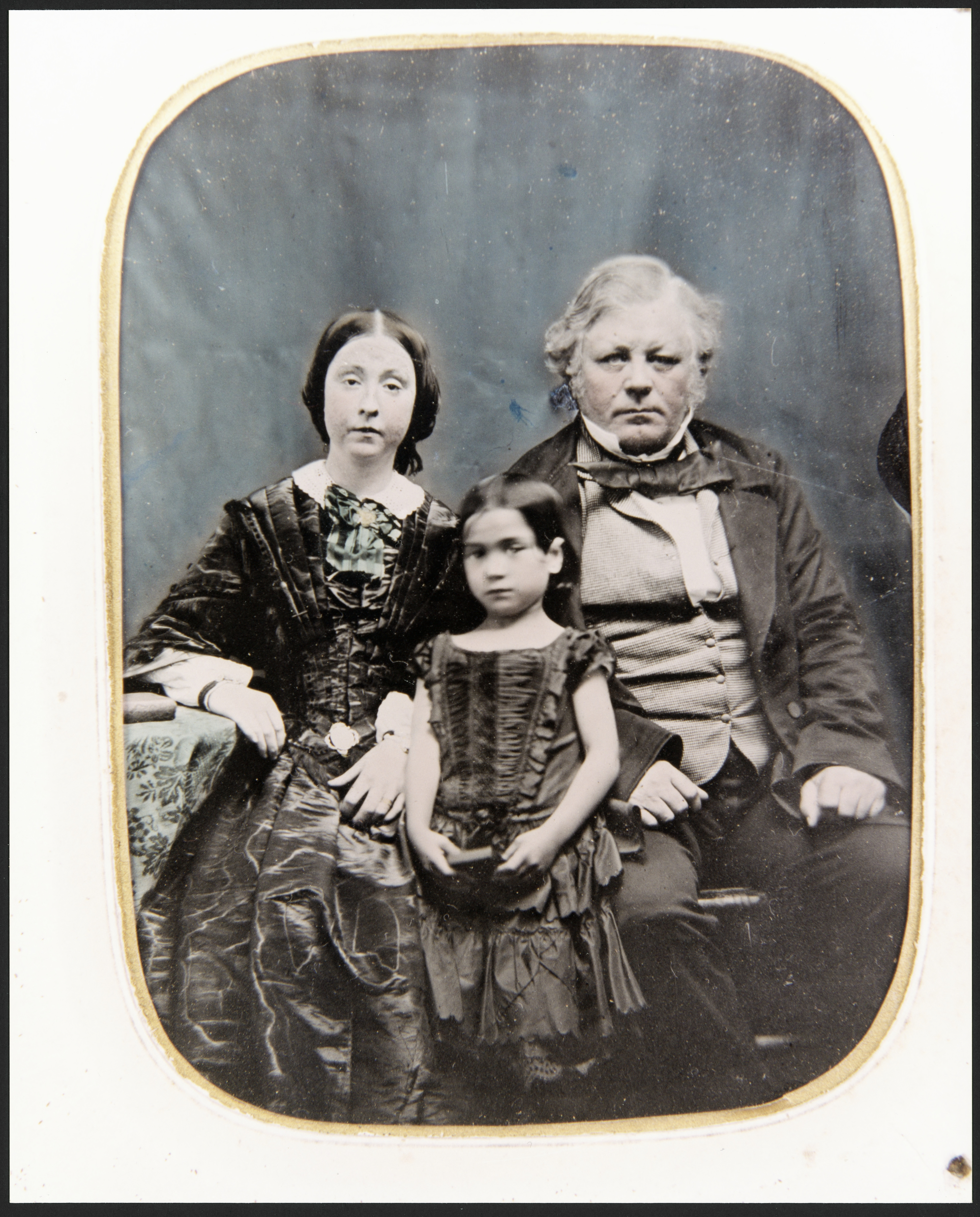
Rhodes, his first wife Sarah King, and their adopted daughter Mary Ann.

W B Rhodes' first marriage was in May 1852 to Sarah King, daughter of solicitor John King. She died in August 1862 aged 28. There were no surviving children. In October 1869 after completing The Grange, a new homestead for his Highland Park property, he married Sarah Ann Moorhouse (c. 1837–1914), a sister of William Sefton Moorhouse and Lucy Ellen Sykes Moorhouse who married John Studholme. Though he had no children by either wife, about 1850 he and a Māori woman called Mary had a daughter, Mary Ann. (Note: Mary Ann was most probably the daughter of Otahui, a daughter of Aperahama Tuhana of Wellington's Ngāti Ruanui. Māori Land Court records as noted in The Dominion Post, 31 January 2009) William and Sarah loved his daughter, and Sarah adopted her. She was provided for in her father's will. In spite of this Mary Ann challenged the will. She lost her case in the New Zealand Supreme Court but she was awarded £750,000 (Note: Approximately £100 million in 2017) on appeal to the Privy Council.

William Barnard Rhodes is buried at Bolton Street Memorial Park, and his grave is part of the memorial trail.

Sarah Ann Rhodes died at the beginning of January 1914 aged 77. She made many charitable bequests including trusts for the university education of young women. One-ninth of her estate went to Victoria College for the education of women and another one-ninth went to the Wellington Boys' Institute.

=== Descendants ===
W B Rhodes' daughter, Mary Ann Rhodes, married her stepmother's younger brother Edward Moorhouse in Wellington in 1883. They moved to England and raised four children, including William Barnard Moorhouse and Mary Rhodes Moorhouse.

Shortly before William Barnard Moorhouse married in 1912, as required by the will of his grandfather, he changed his name to William Barnard Rhodes-Moorhouse. Rhodes-Moorhouse was killed in action in April 1915, he was the first airman awarded the Victoria Cross. His only child was killed in action with the RAF over Tonbridge Kent in September 1940.

Mary Rhodes Moorhouse-Pekkala was married to the Finnish Socialist politician Eino Pekkala. She emigrated to Finland in 1928.

=== The Rhodes brothers ===
Rhodes was the eldest of 14 children. Three brothers followed him to New Zealand; Robert Heaton (1815–1884) of Christchurch, George (1816–1864) of Timaru and Joseph (1826–1905) of Clive, Hawkes Bay.

== Notes ==
New Zealand Parliament
New constituency	Member of Parliament for Wellington Country; 1853–1855	Succeeded by Dudley Ward
