= Helsinki County Prison =

Former prison in Helsinki, Finland

Coordinates: 60°9′59.93″N 24°58′9.76″E

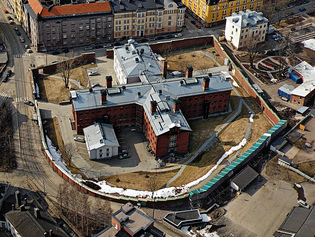
Katajanokka prison seen from the air.

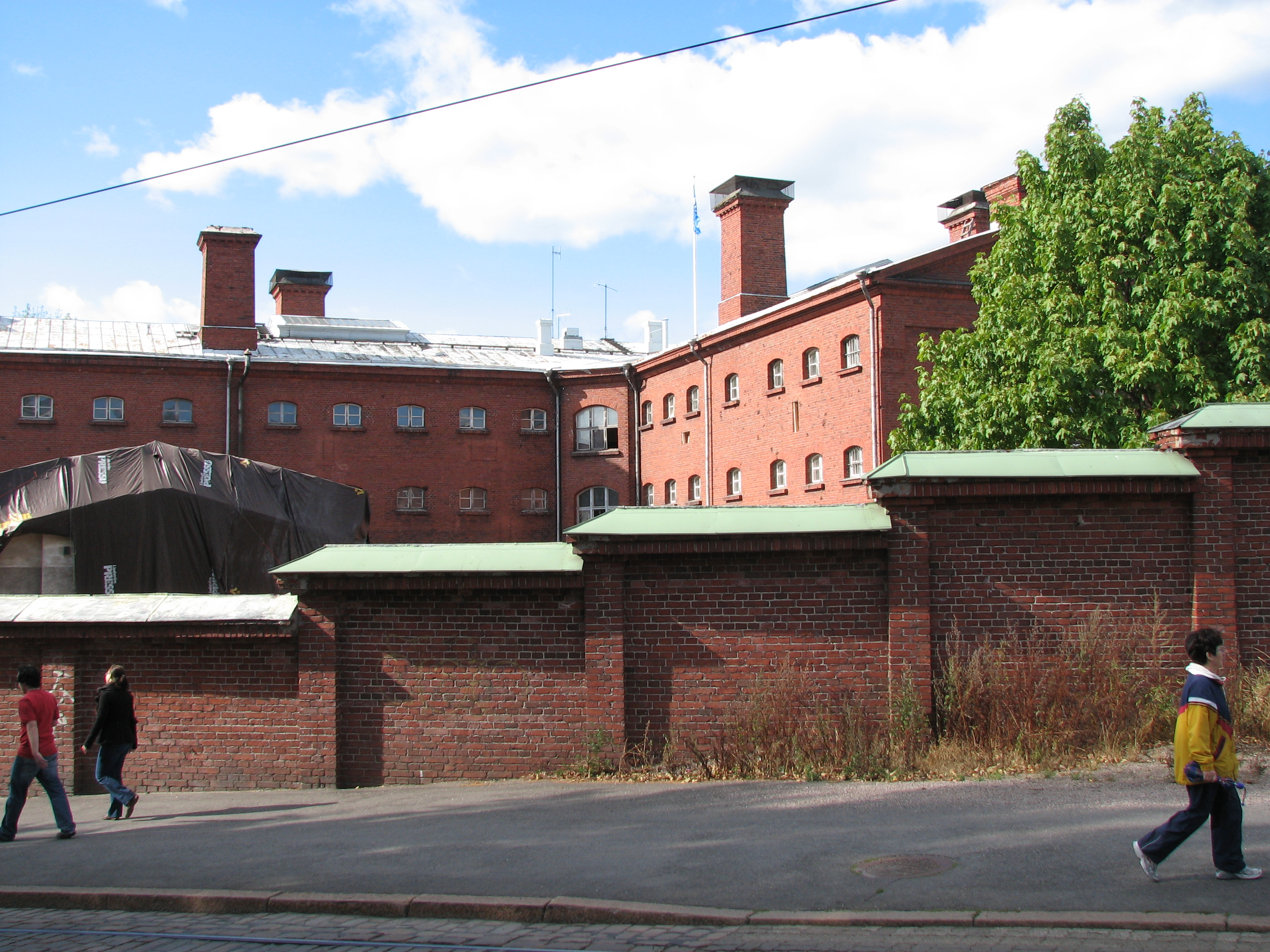
Katajanokka prison from the ground. It now functions as a hotel.

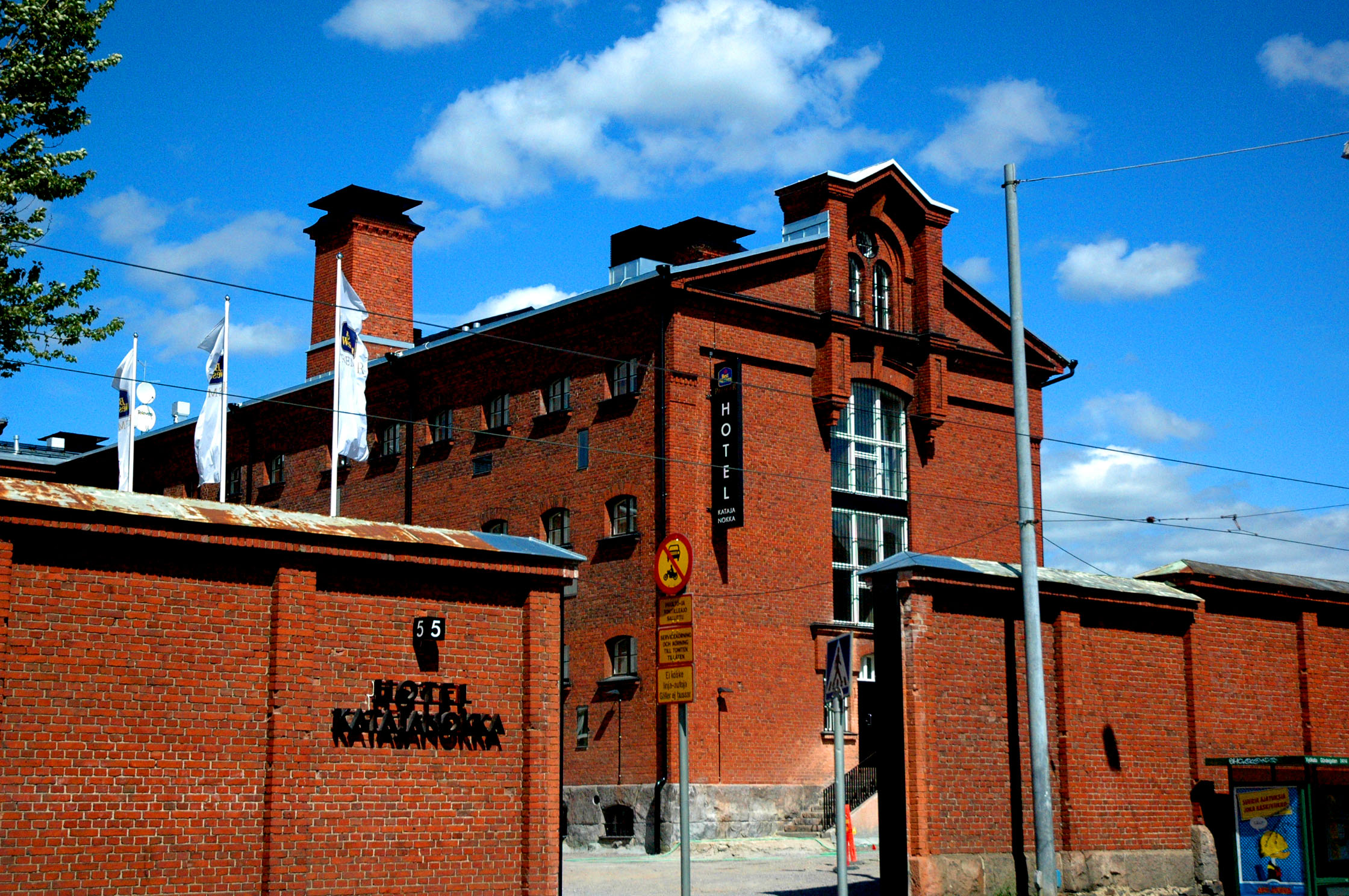
The main entrance to the building is from the street Merikasarminkatu. Entry used to be through a sturdy locked metal gate but after the building was renovated to a hotel the gate was torn away.

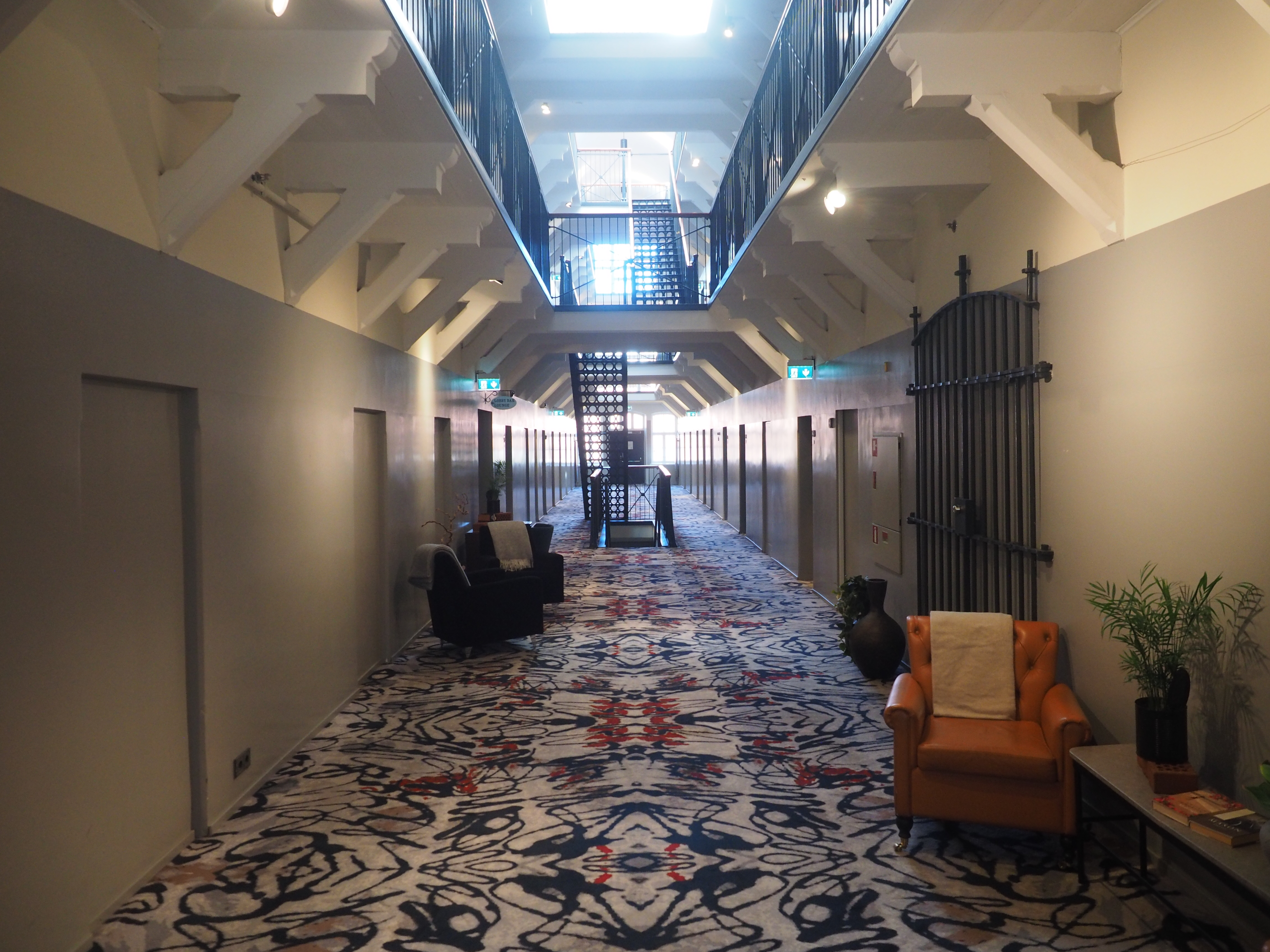
Interior of the building after it was converted from a prison to a hotel.

The Helsinki County Prison ("Helsingin lääninvankila" in Finnish) in the Helsinki city quarters of Katajanokka was a prison that operated from 1837 to 2002. It was established in 1837 by Tsar Nikolai I by the side of the Helsinki Crown Prison, which had operated from 1749. When completed, the prison had 12 cells, two rooms for guards and a worship room which is still extant and has been used for church weddings. The prison area was surrounded by a high red brick wall. The prison was extended in 1888 with the construction of a cell block in the form of a cross, in the classical Philadelphia model; the old part of the prison was converted to an administrative building.

The prison continued functioning after Finnish independence. During the Second World War, the prison was directly hit by an air strike on 6 February 1944. One guard was killed, a fire started and five prisoners used the opportunity to escape.

At the end of the war, some well known convicts from the War-responsibility trials in Finland were kept in the prison, including President Risto Ryti and Prime Minister Väinö Tanner. The Estonian-born writer Hella Wuolijoki was there for high treason during World War II. Another inmate of note was Martta Koskinen, a seamstress and communist spy convicted of high treason who was executed by a firing squad on September 29, 1943. She was the last woman executed in Finland.

During its last years, Helsinki County Prison functioned as a remand prison, where arrested suspects were kept while awaiting trial. To reflect this, in 2001 the prison was renamed Helsinki Remand Prison. Some of the prisoners were also criminals that had failed to pay fines to which they had been sentenced. In 2002, prison operations ceased completely with the completion of the new Vantaa prison.

The building was renovated within the constraints of being a protected landmark and was re-opened in 2007 as a hotel.
