= Porin Lyseo =

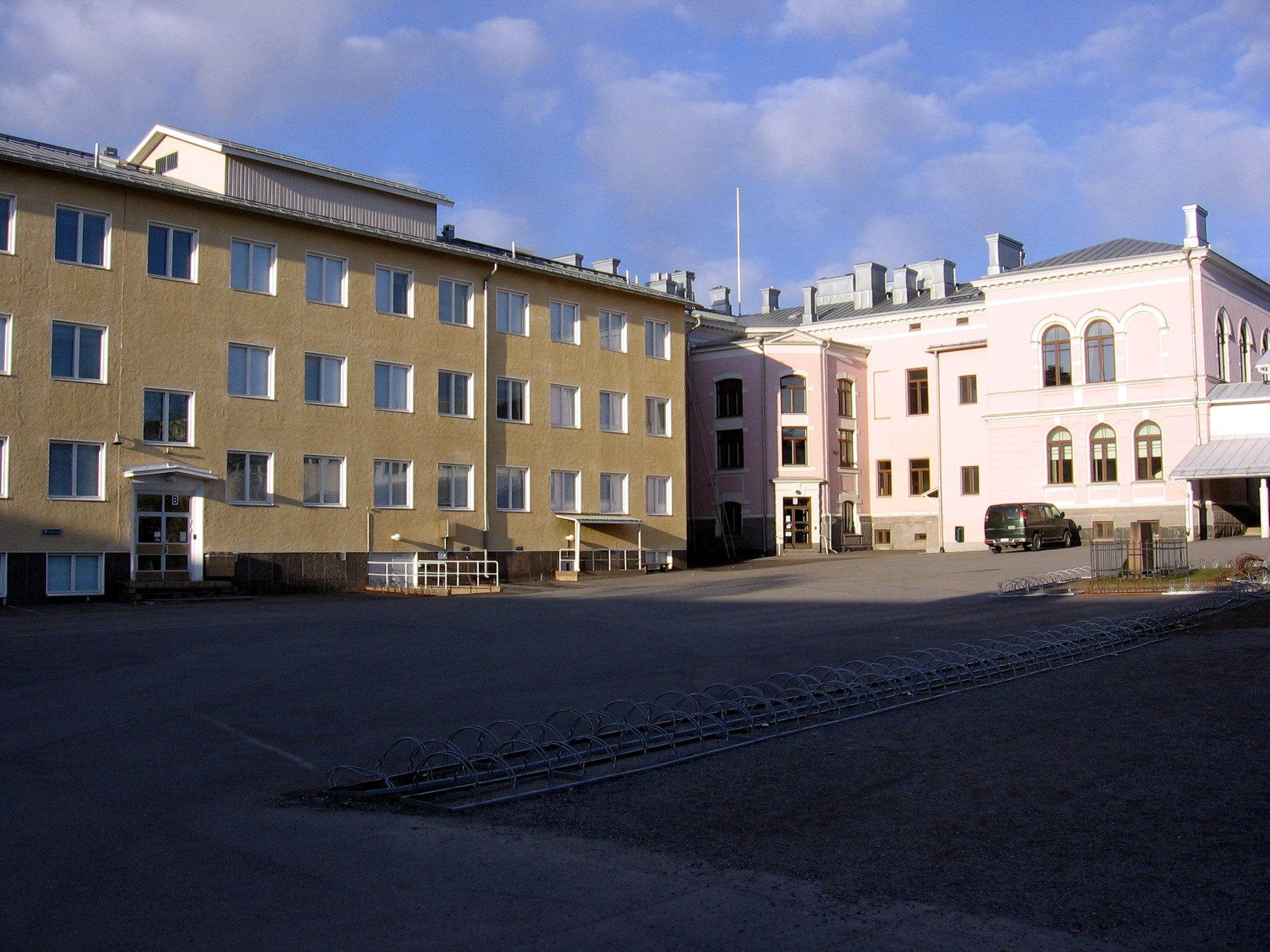

Location
- Annankatu 5 Pori, 28100; Finland
- Coordinates: 61.48854°N 21.788453°E

Information
- School type: Public school
- Established: 1879
- Principal: Kimmo Salokangas
- Grades: 7-9
- Website: http://www.cedunet.fi/lyseo/eyaste.htm

Porin Lyseo (Pori Lyceum) is a school in Pori, Finland, consisting of the upper part of primary school and gymnasium. The school was founded in 1879 as the successor of 1640 established Pori Trivial School. The main building was originally constructed 1857 by the design of architect Georg Theodor von Chiewitz. It was expanded in 1895, the wing with art classes and gym was built 1995. The school also contains an English medium where lessons are taught in both Finnish and English.

== Notable alumni ==
- Anne Holmlund
- Kullervo Manner
- Selim Palmgren
- Risto Ryti
- Alpo Suhonen
- Antti Sumiala
- Tauno Tiusanen
- Väinö Lassila

== Pori Trivial School partbooks ==
1725 copied Pori Trivial School partbooks were found in the Pori Lyceum's library in 1908. They include polyphonic church music of the 16th and 17th century by composers like Melchior Vulpius, Gallus Dressler, Jacobus Gallus, Giovanni Giacomo Gastoldi, Hans Leo Hassler and Daniel Friderici. Music of the books was recorded in 2008 by early music group Sonus Borealis.

== 1918 massacre ==
During the 1918 Finnish Civil War 11 members of White Guards were shot at the Pori Lyceum schoolyard by Red Guard soldiers. The execution was led by Jan Tuckman who was an Estonian seaman in the Imperial Russian Navy.

== Images ==
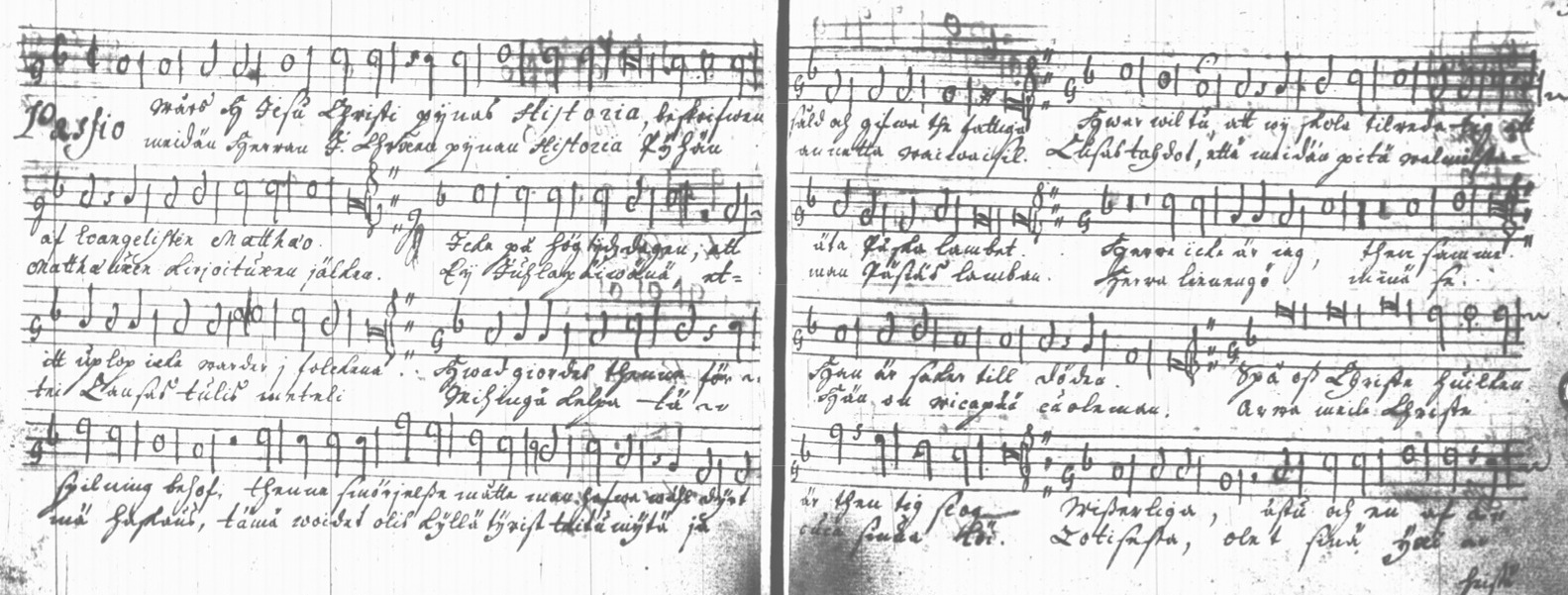
Pori Trivial School Diacantus partbooks, St Matthew Passion by Melchior Vulpius

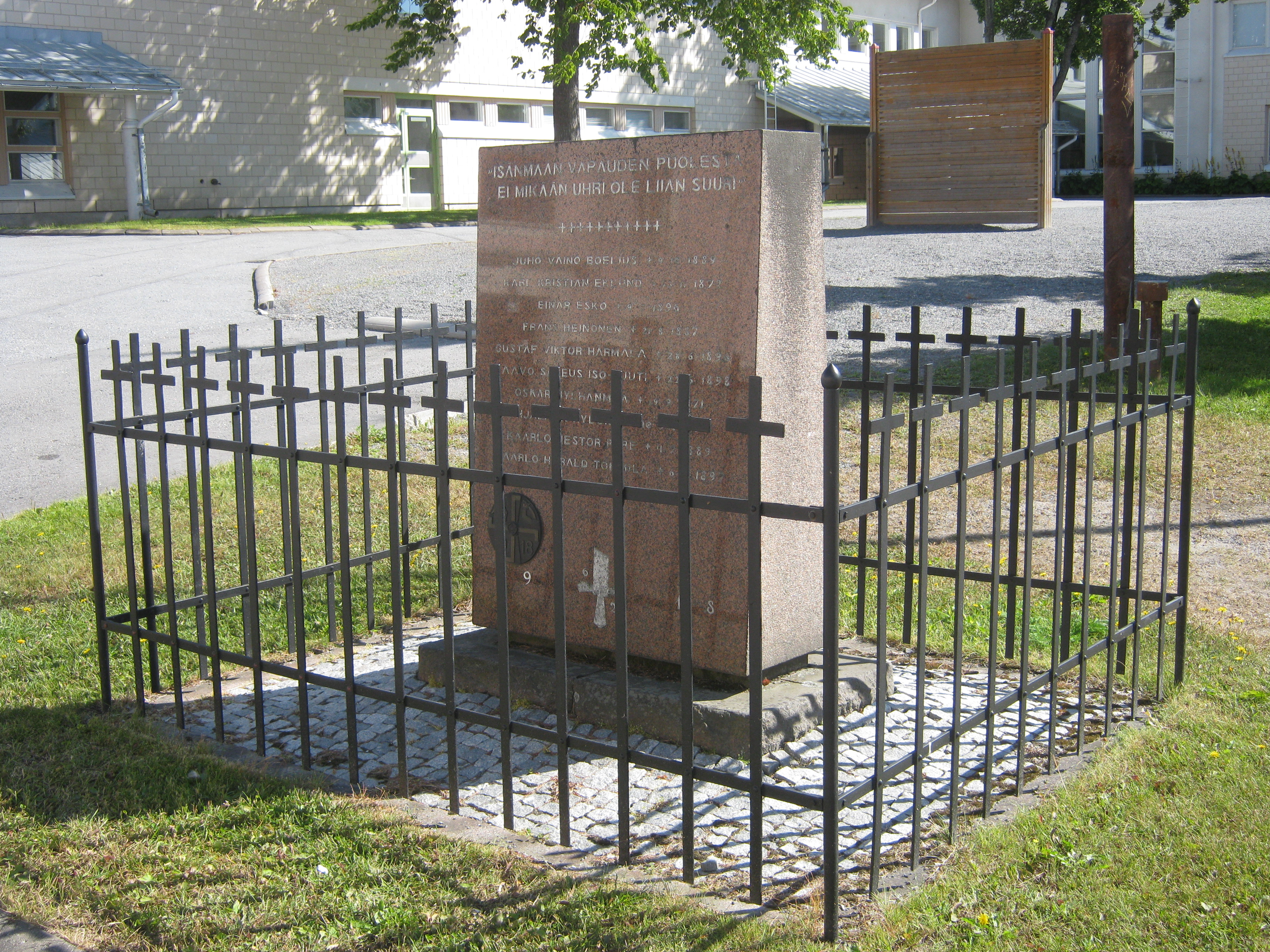
Memorial of 1918 massacre
