= Kuokkanen =

Kuokkanen is a Finnish surname. Notable people with the surname include:

- Erkki Kuokkanen (1887–1956), Finnish lawyer and politician
- Ilpo Kuokkanen (born 1964), Finnish entrepreneur and investor
- Janne Kuokkanen (born 1998), Finnish ice hockey forward
