= Martta Koskinen =

Finnish executed activist (1897–1943)

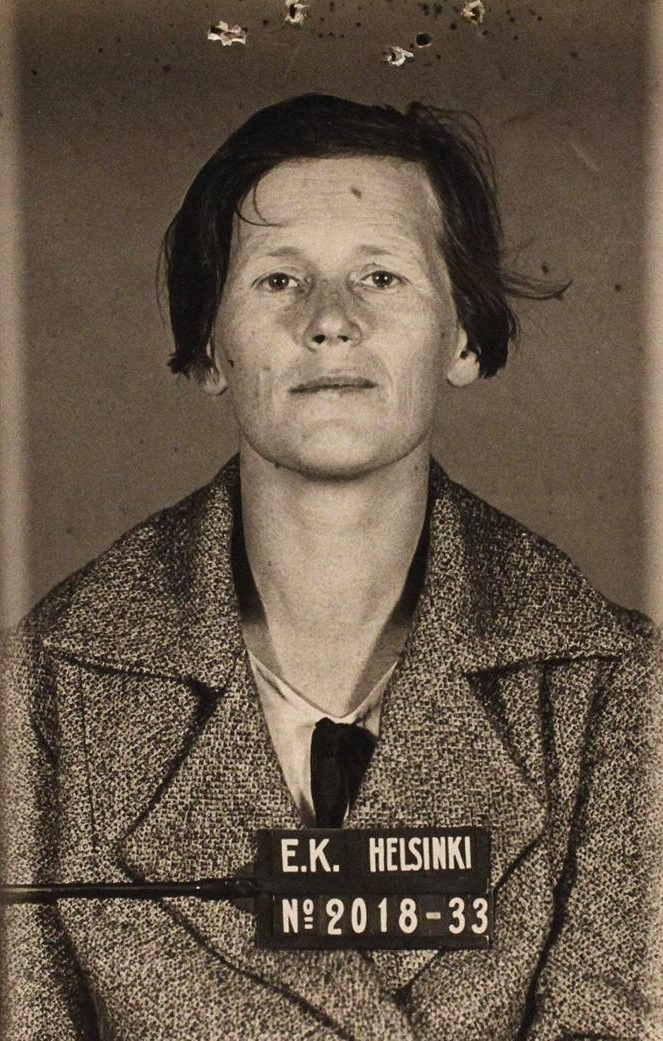
Martta Koskinen

Martta Johanna Koskinen (1897 – 29 September 1943) was a Helsinki seamstress, veteran of the Finnish Civil War, and activist of the SKP who was sentenced to death for high treason and executed by firing squad on 29 September 1943. She was the last woman executed in Finland.

== Early life ==
Koskinen was born in Helsinki in 1897. She was tall and lean, and spoke loudly because scarlet fever had damaged her hearing in her childhood. She was a seamstress by profession. She was introduced to Communism very early on and was a member of the underground Finnish Communist Party. She participated in the Finnish Civil War on the Red side.

Koskinen was first imprisoned in Kotka in 1933 for revolutionary activity with several other women who had sided with the Reds, and had been sentenced to prison for treason. Koskinen was also accused of "membership in a criminal organization" (Finnish Communist Party) and writing "clandestine literature". Koskinen denied the charges, but she was sentenced to two years of prison for treasonous activity.

Koskinen was an acquaintance of two notable female Finnish Communists: Hertta Kuusinen, daughter of Otto Wille Kuusinen, and Hella Wuolijoki. Koskinen worked as a seamstress for Wuolijoki at the Marlebäck manor which Wuolijoki owned, and even when both were in prison. She was able to continue her activities for a long time, since the Finnish Police never suspected her; she appeared too obvious for a spy: tall, visible, loud-voiced, a two-time prior prisoner, and a known communist. The authorities were seeking a "petite person blending easily in the crowd". Her trade as a seamstress helped her to cover her activities.

== Wartime activities ==
During the Continuation War, Koskinen worked as a messenger and spy for the underground Finnish Communist Party. Koskinen was in direct contact with Yrjö Leino. She also worked as a helper for deserters and infiltrators.

In December 1942, Koskinen's most important associate, a spy and deserter named Olavi Heiman, was caught. He revealed Koskinen in an attempt to avoid being shot. Koskinen was arrested at her apartment at Pihlajatie 21, Helsinki. She was caught red-handed: The police found secret information and confidential messages at her home, including information on military secrets. The police interrogated Koskinen, who admitted only what the police had found out but nothing else. She was accused of espionage and high treason in the military court, both punishable by death. One of the witnesses for the prosecutor was the infiltrator Kerttu Nuorteva, who saved her own life by testifying against Koskinen.

Koskinen never admitted anything, and probably saved the life of the head of the Finnish Communist Party, Yrjö Leino, who was later to become Finnish Minister of Interior Affairs. She was sentenced to death on both charges, espionage and high treason, on 15 June 1943. Koskinen declined to seek commutation of the sentence.

Minister Väinö Tanner and his wife Linda attempted to have Koskinen's sentence commuted to life imprisonment because of their personal convictions against the death penalty. They usually succeeded, but Koskinen's case appeared too grave: she had been caught red-handed, she appeared as an unrepentant hard-boiled Communist, she showed no remorse whatsoever, and the President had decided to make an example of her. President Risto Ryti declined to grant any clemency on 17 September 1943. According to the son of Yrjö Leino, Olle Leino, the example worked: the espionage ring broke up after her death.

== Execution ==
Koskinen was transferred from prison by train to Malmi, Helsinki, and executed on 29 September 1943 by military police firing squad together with Olavi Heiman at the Malmi shooting range. According to Olle Leino, Koskinen's last words were death to Risto Ryti, Väinö Tanner and Mannerheim. Koskinen and Heiman both were buried in a pauper's grave at the Malmi cemetery.

Koskinen was the last woman to be executed in Finland and the last Finnish civilian to be executed for a military crime.
