= Christina Twomey =

Australian historian and academic

Christina Twomey FASSA, FAHA
- Awards: New South Wales Premier's State Records – John and Patricia Ward History Prize (2008); Fellow of the Academy of the Social Sciences in Australia (2016); Fellow of the Australian Academy of the Humanities (2016); New South Wales Premier's Australian History Prize (2018)

Academic background
- Education: University of Melbourne (BA [Hons], PhD)
- Thesis: "Without Natural Protectors": Histories of Deserted and Destitute Colonial Women in Victoria 1850–1865 (1996)

Academic work
- Discipline: History
- Sub-discipline: Cultural history of war Gender history
- Institutions: Monash University; Deakin University
- Notable works: Australia's Forgotten Prisoners (2007); The Battle Within (2018)

Christina Louise Twomey, FASSA, FAHA is an Australian historian and academic.

== Education and career ==
Twomey was born in Queensland and attended Mac.Robertson Girls' High School in Melbourne. She graduated from the University of Melbourne with a Bachelor of Arts with Honours. She returned to the university in 1992 to complete her Doctor of Philosophy, graduating in 1996. She was the head of Philosophical, Historical and International Studies at Monash University in Melbourne. Her area of study focuses on the cultural history of war.

In 2004 Twomey won the Margaret George Award, a grant presented by National Archives of Australia to emerging historians, for her "exploration of the experiences of Australian civilians interned by the Japanese in World War II". Twomey's 2008 book, Australia's Forgotten Prisoners: Civilians Interned by the Japanese in World War Two won a New South Wales Premier's History Award in the John and Patricia Ward History Prize category. In 2009, the National Archives of Australia awarded Twomey the Frederick Watson Fellowship.

Twomey was president of the International Australian Studies Association in 2011 to 2012. Between 2012 and 2015, she was the co-editor of Australian Historical Studies alongside Catharine Coleborne, after which she was appointed chair of the Board managing that publication. In 2016 her work as an historian was recognised by her election as fellow of both the Academy of the Social Sciences in Australia and Australian Academy of the Humanities. In May 2016, she attended a Historians without Borders conference in Helsinki.

In 2018, Twomey won the New South Wales Premier's Australian History Prize for her book, The Battle Within: POWs in Postwar Australia.

== Bibliography ==
=== Author ===
- — (2002). Deserted and Destitute: Motherhood, Wife Desertion, and Colonial Welfare. Kew: Australian Scholarly Press. ISBN 1740970101.
- — (2007). Australia's Forgotten Prisoners: Civilians Interned by the Japanese in World War Two. Cambridge: Cambridge University Press. ISBN 9780521612890.
- —; Peel, Mark (2012). A History of Australia. Houndmills: Palgrave Macmillan. ISBN 9780230001640.
  - —; Peel, Mark (2018). A History of Australia (2nd ed.). London: Palgrave. ISBN 9781137605498.
- — (2018). The Battle Within: POWs in Postwar Australia. Sydney: NewSouth Publishing. ISBN 9781742248493.

=== Editor ===
- —, ed. (2014). Australians in Papua New Guinea, 1960–1975. St Lucia: University of Queensland Press. ISBN 9781921902437.
- —; Koh, Ernest, eds. (2015). The Pacific War: Aftermaths, Remembrance and Culture. Milton Park: Routledge. ISBN 9780415740647.
