= Erkki Tuomioja =

Finnish politician (born 1946)

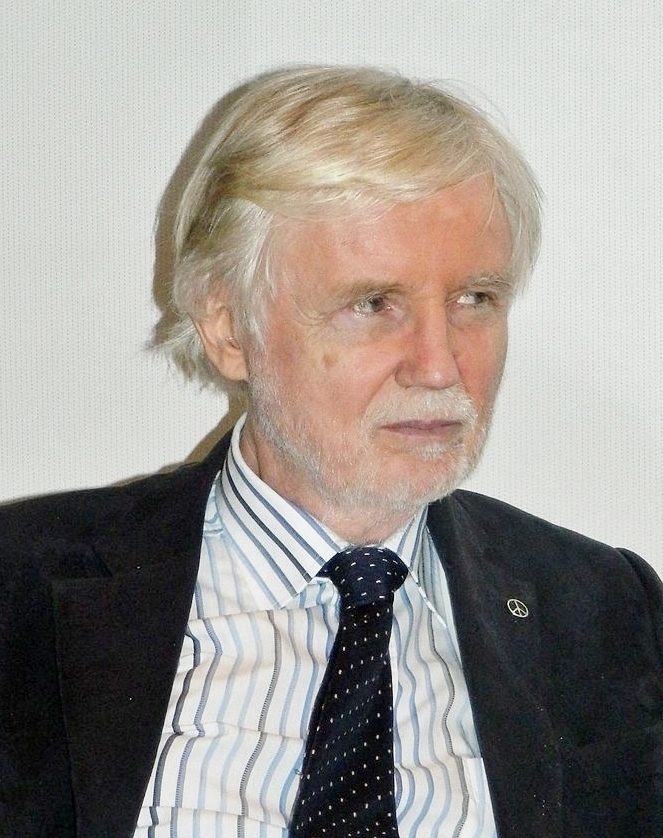
- Tuomioja in 2014

Minister of Foreign Affairs
- In office 22 June 2011 – 29 May 2015
- Prime Minister: Jyrki Katainen; Alexander Stubb
- Preceded by: Alexander Stubb
- Succeeded by: Timo Soini
- In office 25 February 2000 – 19 April 2007
- Prime Minister: Paavo Lipponen; Anneli Jäätteenmäki; Matti Vanhanen
- Preceded by: Tarja Halonen
- Succeeded by: Ilkka Kanerva

Minister of Trade and Industry
- In office 15 April 1999 – 25 February 2000
- Prime Minister: Paavo Lipponen
- Preceded by: Antti Kalliomäki
- Succeeded by: Sinikka Mönkäre

President of the Nordic Council
- In office 1 January 2008 – 31 December 2008
- Preceded by: Dagfinn Høybråten
- Succeeded by: Sinikka Bohlin

Personal details
- Born: Erkki Sakari Tuomioja; 1 July 1946 (age 80) Helsinki, Finland
- Party: Social Democratic
- Spouse: Marja Helena Rajala (m. 1978)
- Education: University of Helsinki
- Website: tuomioja.org

Erkki Sakari Tuomioja (born 1 July 1946) is a Finnish politician and has previously been a member of the Finnish Parliament. From 2000 to 2007 and 2011 to 2015, he served as the minister for foreign affairs. He was president of the Nordic Council in 2008.

Tuomioja is a member of the Social Democratic Party of Finland, although his political views are thought to be more to the left than the party line. He is also a member of ATTAC. In 1975, Tuomioja dated Tarja Halonen who later became the president of Finland.

== Biography ==
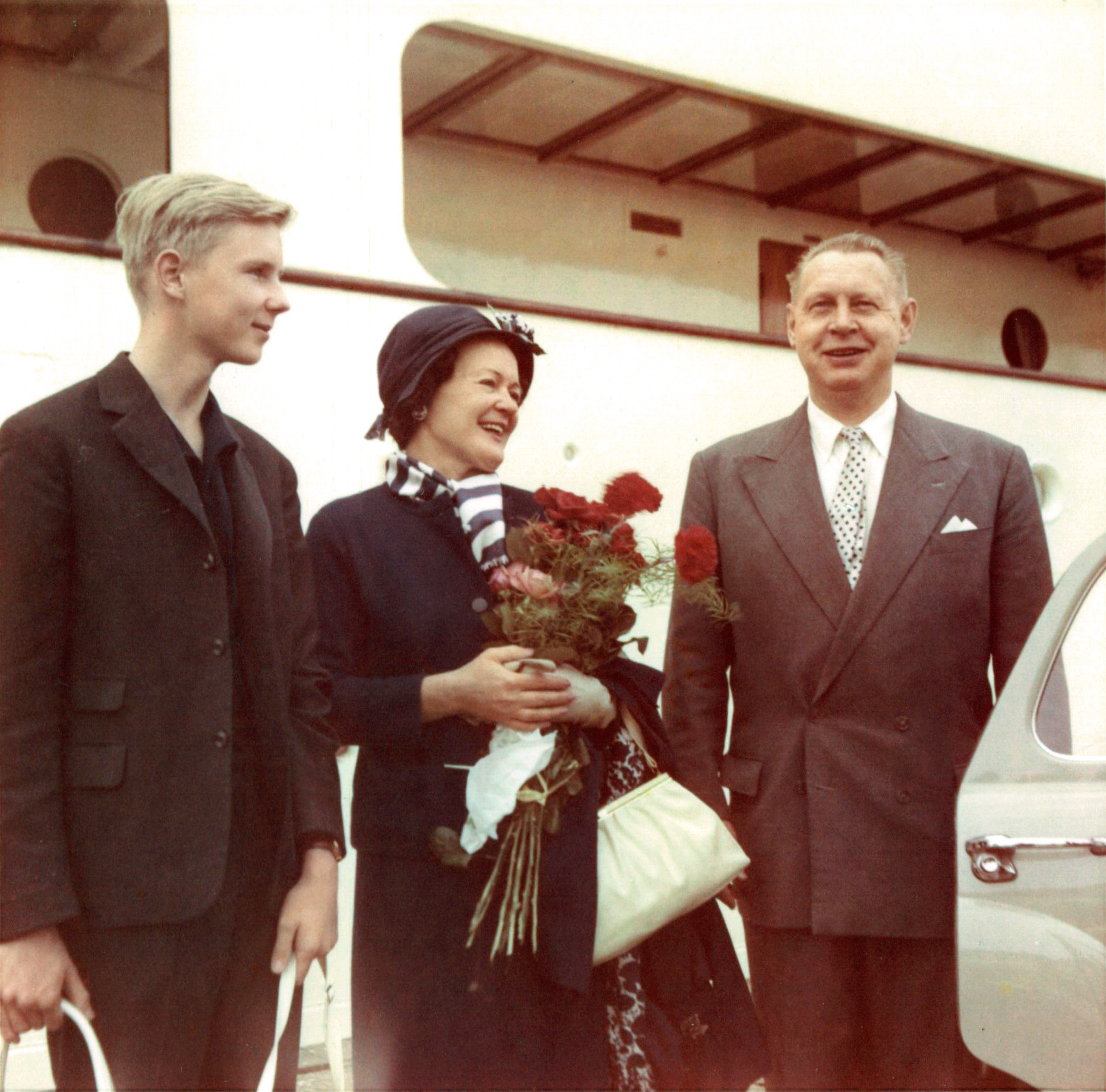
Erkki, mother Vappu and father Sakari in 1961

Tuomioja comes from a family of politicians. His father Sakari Tuomioja was a prominent liberal Finnish politician and diplomat, and the challenger of Urho Kekkonen for the conservatives and liberals in the 1956 presidential elections. His maternal grandmother was Hella Wuolijoki, the Estonian born writer and socialist activist.

Tuomioja holds the degrees of Master of Social Sciences (1971) and Master of Science in Economics and Business Administration (1974) from the Helsinki School of Economics, as well as Licentiate in Social Sciences (1980) and Doctor in Social Sciences (1996) from the University of Helsinki. In addition to Finnish, Tuomioja speaks Swedish, English, French, German and Estonian.

Tuomioja has been a member of the Finnish Parliament 1970–1979 and 1991–present. He held the position of minister of trade and industry in Lipponen's 2nd government, and became the minister of foreign affairs after Tarja Halonen was elected as president of Finland. Tuomioja is the longest serving minister for foreign affairs of Finland.

Tuomioja, like several other Finnish socialist politicians of today, took part in the illegal occupation of the Old Student House (Vanha ylioppilastalo) in Helsinki on 25 November 1968. He was a member of the anti-war group Committee of 100 of Finland and took part in the so-called Erik Schüller case, in which a group of students made public incitement against obligatory conscription. Despite his anti-war stance, Tuomioja did carry out his own mandatory military service and is a reservist staff sergeant.

Tuomioja is the author of several books. His A Delicate Shade of Pink about his grandmother Hella Wuolijoki and her sister Salme Murrik won the Non-Fiction Finlandia Prize in 2006. The book was originally written in English and translated to Finnish as Häivähdys punaista. In the 1970s and 1980s he was the editor-in-chief of Ydin, a foreign policy and political magazine.

Tuomioja was behind the initiative to establish Historians without Borders in Finland as an NGO. He has acted as Chairman of the Board of HWB Finland since the founding meeting in the summer of 2015. Tuomioja is a declared atheist.

== European Union presidency ==
When Finland held the rotating European Union presidency in the second half of 2006, Tuomioja had a prominent role as the spokesman of European Union foreign policy. He was among the first to demand an immediate cessation of hostilities in the 2006 Israel–Lebanon conflict. He was one of Finland's most dominant politicians in the 1990s.

== See also ==
- Israel–Finland relations

Political offices
Preceded by Tarja Halonen	Minister for Foreign Affairs; 2000–2007	Succeeded by Ilkka Kanerva
Preceded by Alexander Stubb	Minister for Foreign Affairs; 2011–2015	Succeeded by Timo Soini
