= Historians without Borders =

Finnish organisation

- Historioitsijat ilman rajoja
- Formation: 2015
- Legal status: registered association
- Headquarters: Helsinki
- Chairperson: Erkki Tuomioja
- Website: https://www.historianswithoutborders.fi/en/

Historians without Borders is a Finnish organisation. It was founded at the initiative of Erkki Tuomioja, the former foreign minister of Finland. The purpose of the organization is to further public discussion about history and to promote the use of historical knowledge for peace-building and conflict-resolution. The organisation has an international network of Historians without Borders and coordinating committee, with which the organisation aims to promote their goals.

== History ==
In June 2015, Erkki Tuomioja convened a number of historians and policy makers to a meeting, which led to the founding of HWB. First board was appointed, which included names like Finnish politician and historian Pilvi Torsti, former editor-in-chief of Helsingin Sanomat Janne Virkkunen and executive director of CMI Tuija Talvitie. Erkki Tuomioja has acted as Chairman of the Board since the founding meeting. Behind the initiative was Tuomioja's concern, that history is often used and abused for personal or political purposes. Inadequate knowledge of history makes people more vulnerable to manipulation of politicians, who can use historical myths and propaganda to their advantage easier. HWB aims to prevent the abuse of history by bringing historians and their knowledge to society and conflict-resolution.

HWB has aimed from the beginning to the wider international co-operation between historians across the borders. With this in mind, HWB organised in May 2016 and international conference "Historians without Borders: The Use and Abuse of History in Conflicts" at the University of Helsinki. Around 300 participants gathered in Helsinki and the conference ended with the creation of an international network of Historians without Borders and the appointment of a Coordinating Committee. Members of this committee are Jan C. Behrends, Carl Bildt, Vasu Gounden, Margaret MacMillan, Erkki Tuomioja, Christina Twomey and Sergei Zhuravlev.

== Aims ==
- promote and deepen general and comprehensive knowledge and understanding of history
- promote open and free access to historical material and archives
- promote interactive dialogue between different views and interpretations of history to bring closer diverging views of the course of historical events
- support efforts to impede the abuse of history to foster conflicts or to sustain enemy images and distorted myths, and to contribute to the use of history in defusing and resolving conflicts.
