= William Henry Rhodes-Moorhouse =

British World War II flying ace

- Born: 4 March 1914; London, England
- Died: 6 September 1940 (aged 26); Tunbridge Wells, England
- Burial place: Parnham House, Dorset
- Relatives: William Rhodes-Moorhouse (father)
- Military career
- Allegiance: United Kingdom
- Branch: Royal Air Force
- Rank: Flight Lieutenant
- Unit: No. 601 Squadron RAF
- Conflicts: Second World War: Battle of Britain †
- Awards: Distinguished Flying Cross

William Henry Rhodes-Moorhouse, DFC (4 March 1914 – 6 September 1940) was a Royal Air Force fighter pilot and flying ace who was killed in action during the Battle of Britain.

== Early life ==
Rhodes-Moorhouse was born on 4 March 1914 at a house in Brompton Square, London. He was the son of William Barnard Rhodes-Moorhouse and Linda Beatrice (née Morrit). His father served as a pilot with the Royal Flying Corps in the First World War, but was killed in April 1915 when the younger Rhodes-Moorhouse was little more than a year old. He had been wounded in action during a bombing raid near Kortrijk, Belgium, and died of his injuries the next day. The elder Rhodes-Moorhouse was posthumously awarded the Victoria Cross for his actions in that last raid, becoming the first airman to receive the medal.

The Rhodes-Moorhouse family enjoyed considerable wealth and circulated in the top echelons of upper-class society of the time. William was educated at Eton College, where he was able to obtain his pilot's licence aged 17. In October 1933, William inherited his father's estate of over £250,000 (a huge sum for the time). After travelling extensively, on 15 September 1936 at Marylebone Rhodes-Moorhouse married Amalia Demetriadi, who had been approached to be screen-tested for the role of Scarlett O'Hara in the film Gone with the Wind, but declined.

A keen sportsman, Rhodes-Moorhouse was selected for the British Winter Olympics team for the 1936 Winter Olympics, but an accident on the ski jump prevented him from competing.

== Royal Air Force ==
In 1937 he joined the Royal Air Force (RAF), flying Bristol Blenheims with No. 601 Squadron RAF. At the start of the Second World War, No. 601 Squadron moved to Biggin Hill. On 28 November 1939 Rhodes-Moorhouse participated in a raid by the squadron's Blenheims on the German seaplane base at Borkum. The squadron re-equipped with the Hawker Hurricane in March 1940. With the German attack on France in May 1940 'A' flight of No. 601 Squadron were sent to Merville airfield. Rhodes-Moorhouse claimed a Heinkel He 111 bomber shot down near Brussels on 18 May. On 19 May he force-landed Hurricane L2088 after the auxiliary fuel tank was holed by return fire from a Bf 110 near Douai. He then claimed a Bf 109 shot down on 22 May.

No. 601 Squadron's forces were withdrawn to Tangmere on 17 June, and in July flew against the initial Luftwaffe attacks over the Channel and the south coast. Rhodes-Moorhouse shared in the destruction of a Do 17 on 7 July and 11 July. He also claimed a Ju 88 and shared another on 16 July. He was awarded the Distinguished Flying Cross in late July 1940.

On 11 August Rhodes-Moorhouse claimed two Bf 109s destroyed. On that same day, his wife Amalia's 21-year-old brother, Dick Demetriadi, who served in the same squadron, was shot down and killed. He claimed another Bf 109 on 18 August, a shared He 111 on 30 August, and two Bf 109s probably destroyed on 31 August, with a Do 17 destroyed on 4 September.

On 6 September, No. 601 Squadron were engaged above Tunbridge Wells with Bf 109s. Rhodes-Moorhouse's Hurricane (P8818) was shot down and crashed near High Brooms railway viaduct. He is buried in a private cemetery in the grounds of his family's former home, Parnham House in Dorset, near Beaminster, with his father.
