= Malmi shooting range =

Former shooting range in Helsinki, Finland

Coordinates: 60.234691°N 25.060333°E

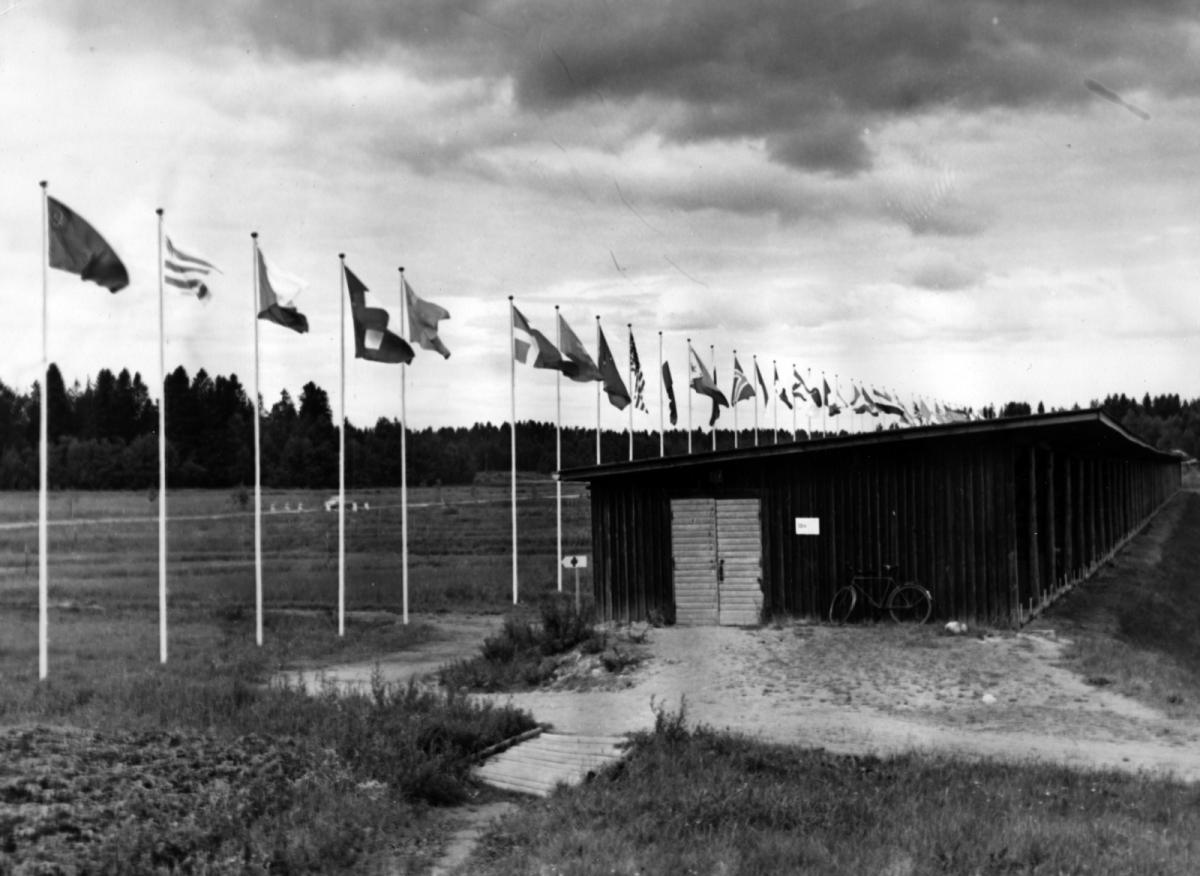
Malmi shooting range during the 1952 Summer Olympics

Malmi shooting range (Finnish: Malmin ampumarata) was a shooting range in the Malmi district of Helsinki, Finland, active from 1937 to 1993. The shooting range was built by the Finnish Army for the 1937 ISSF World Shooting Championships and was also used in the shooting events of the 1952 Summer Olympics.

During the World War II, Malmi shooting range was an execution site. One of the persons shot in Malmi was Martta Koskinen, the last woman executed in Finland. The shooting range was closed in 1993. Today it is a residential and recreation area which is a part of the Kivikko district.
