= William Barnard Rhodes-Moorhouse =

Recipient of the Victoria Cross (1887–1915)

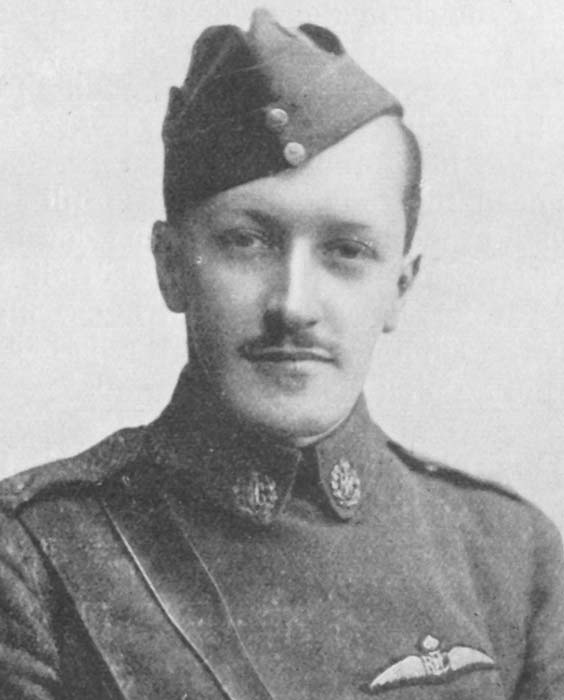
- Born: William Barnard Moorhouse; 26 September 1887; Rokeby, Yorkshire, England
- Died: 27 April 1915 (aged 27); Merville, France
- Burial place: Parnham House, Dorset, England
- Relatives: William Henry Rhodes-Moorhouse (son); William Barnard Rhodes (grandfather); William Sefton Moorhouse (uncle); Mary Rhodes Moorhouse-Pekkala (sister)
- Military career
- Allegiance: United Kingdom
- Branch: Royal Flying Corps
- Service years: 1914–1915
- Rank: Lieutenant
- Units: No. 2 Squadron RFC
- Conflicts: World War I
- Awards: Victoria Cross

William Barnard Rhodes-Moorhouse VC (born William Barnard Moorhouse; 26 September 1887 – 27 April 1915) was an English recipient of the Victoria Cross, the highest and most prestigious award for gallantry in the face of the enemy that can be awarded to British and Commonwealth forces. Rhodes-Moorhouse was the first airman to be awarded the VC.

== Early life ==
William Barnard Moorhouse was born at Rokeby, Yorkshire, England. His mother Mary Ann Rhodes (born c 1850) was the daughter of William Barnard Rhodes and Otahi, a member of the Taranaki (Tuturu), Ngati Tama, Ngati Ruanui and Te Āti Awa Māori nations in the Wellington area of New Zealand. When Rhodes married Sarah King, the very young child Mary Anne was "given" (Whaangai) to the newlyweds. After his first wife died, Rhodes married Sarah Ann Moorhouse, the sister of William Sefton Moorhouse, a prominent Canterbury politician and settler. She adopted Mary Ann Rhodes.

Mary Anne's father had been a whaling captain who became a prominent Wellington settler, businessman and politician. On his death Mary Anne Rhodes received a legacy that made her the richest woman in New Zealand.

She married her second adoptive mother's younger brother, Edward Moorhouse, in Wellington in 1883. They moved to England and raised four children, including William, who went to Harrow School and (briefly) Trinity Hall, Cambridge, which he left in 1909.

William took private flying lessons and gained his pilot's certificate in that year. Besides designing aircraft he competed in aviation races and was the first to cross the English Channel, from Douai to Ashford, Kent, with two passengers, his wife and a London Evening News journalist, in a biplane.

On a visit to New Zealand in 1907 while practising for a motorcycle race on New Brighton Beach, Christchurch, he killed Kennett Frederick Gourlay, a seven-year-old child who had run out in front of him. He was charged with manslaughter but acquitted by the Supreme Court in Christchurch in August that year. In 1912 he was again charged with manslaughter following the death of Arthur William Cheacker on a county road in Gloucestershire while driving his racing car.

He changed his surname to Rhodes-Moorhouse in 1912, shortly before he married, as required by the will of his grandfather. His wife, Linda Beatrice Morrit, was also a flying enthusiast. She died in 1973 aged 86.

== World War I service ==
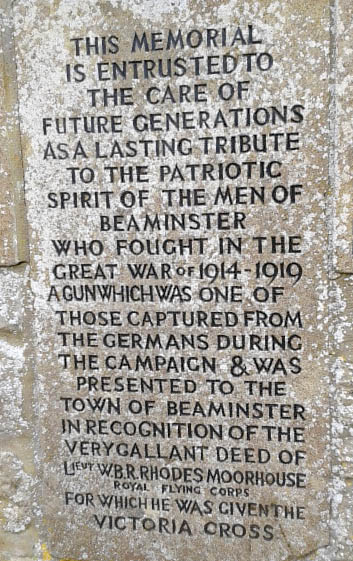
The Memorial Stone near a local church in Beaminster, Dorset.

At the outbreak of war Rhodes-Moorhouse enlisted in the Royal Flying Corps and as a second lieutenant was posted to Farnborough. Seeking to serve on an operational basis, he obtained a posting to No. 2 Squadron on 20 March 1915 at Merville, flying the B.E.2.

On 26 April 1915 at Kortrijk, Belgium, Rhodes-Moorhouse swept low over the railway junction that he had been ordered to attack. He released his 100 lb (45 kg) bomb and was immediately plunged into a heavy barrage of small arms fire from rifles and a machine-gun in the belfry of Kortrijk Church; he was severely wounded by a bullet in his thigh, and his plane was badly hit. Returning to the Allied lines, he again ran into heavy fire from the ground and was wounded twice more. He managed to get his aircraft back, and insisted on making his report before being taken to the Casualty Clearing Station. He died the next day, 27 April 1915. For this action he was awarded the VC. The citation for his award read as follows:

"For most conspicuous bravery on 26th April, 1915, in flying to Courtrai and dropping bombs on the railway line near that station. On starting the return journey he was mortally wounded, but succeeded in flying for 35 miles to his destination, at a very low altitude, and reported the successful accomplishment of his object. He has since died of his wounds."

His body was returned to England and buried at the family home Parnham House, Beaminster, Dorset, and later the ashes of his son were placed alongside him.

== William Henry Rhodes-Moorhouse ==
His son, also called William (Willie), was less than a year old when his father died. He went on to join No. 601 Squadron RAF. He was shot down and killed over Kent during the Battle of Britain in 1940, shortly after being awarded the DFC.
