= Salme Pekkala-Dutt =

Estonian-British communist politician

- Born: Salme Anette Murrik; 29 August 1888; Taagepera, Helme Parish, Governorate of Livonia, Russian Empire (now Estonia)
- Died: 30 August 1964 (aged 76); London, UK
- Other name: Salme Anette Murrik Pekkala
- Occupations: Politician; essayist; writer; translator
- Spouse(s): Eino Pekkala (m. 1913; div. 1924) R. Palme Dutt (m. 1924)
- Relatives: Hella Wuolijoki (sister); Erkki Tuomioja (great-nephew); Mauno Pekkala (ex-brother-in-law)
- Writing career
- Pen name: Sancho

Salme Anette Pekkala-Dutt (née Murrik; 30 August 1888 – 30 August 1964), known by the pen name Sancho, was an Estonian-British communist politician, essayist, writer and translator.

== Early life and education ==
Salme Anette Murrik was born 29 August 1888 (Note: Also cited as 30 August 1888 and 17 August 1888.) in Taagepera, Governorate of Livonia (present-day, Estonia) to Ernst Murrik and Katarina Kokamägi. One of five siblings, Pekkala-Dutt was the younger sister of the writer Hella Wuolijoki.

Pekkala-Dutt grew up and attended primary school in Valga. Pekkala-Dutt later moved to Tartu and attended Pushkin's Girls Gymnasium. In 1905, Pekkala-Dutt was forced to leave the Pushkin's Girls Gymnasium due to her participation in underground activities linked to the 1905 Russian Revolution.

Pekkala-Dutt moved to Moscow where she studied at a Gymnasium before attending university.

== Career ==
Due to her revolutionary activities, Pekkala-Dutt went into voluntarily exile in Siberia for two years. Pekkala-Dutt later relocated in Finland in 1908.

In 1920, settled in Britain as a Comintern representative. During the early years of the Communist Party of Great Britain, Pekkala-Dutt acted as the link to Moscow for her future husband R. Palme Dutt. Salme Murrik had been directed to Britain on Lenin's orders to participate in forming the Communist Party there. She remained an ardent admirer of Stalin even after Khruschchev's 1956 secret speech critical of Stalin's cult of personality.

Pekkala-Dutt's treatment of the Chartist movement, When England Arose, was published in 1939. A collection of poems, entitled Lucifer and Other Poems, was published in London in 1966.

== Personal life ==
Through her sister Hella Pekkala-Dutt was the great-aunt of the Finnish politician Erkki Tuomioja.

In 1913, Pekkala-Dutt married the Finnish politician Eino Pekkala. Pekkala-Dutt and Pekkala later divorced in January 1924.

On 5 August 1924, Pekkala-Dutt married R. Palme Dutt, a British journalist, theoretician and member of the Communist Party of Great Britain, in Stockholm.

On 30 August 1964 Pekkala-Dutt died in London, aged 76.
