= George Rhodes (farmer) =

New Zealand pastoralist

George Rhodes (14 July 1816 – 18 June 1864) was a New Zealand pastoralist. He was born in Epworth, Lincolnshire, England in 1816. William Barnard Rhodes, his eldest brother, was the first from his family to settle in New Zealand in 1840. George Rhodes' third son Arthur Rhodes went on to be a member of parliament and mayor of Christchurch.
