= Eino Pekkala =

Finnish lawyer and politician (1887–1956)

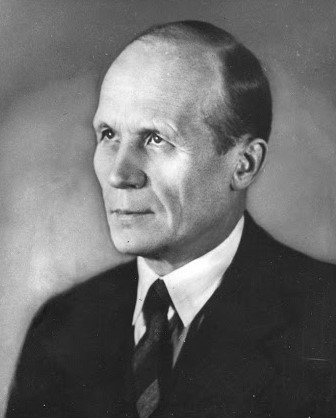

31st Minister of Education of Finland
- In office 28 December 1945 – 26 March 1946
- Prime Minister: Juho Kusti Paasikivi
- Preceded by: Johan Helo
- Succeeded by: Eino Kilpi

31st Minister of Justice of Finland
- In office 26 March 1946 – 29 July 1948
- Prime Minister: Mauno Pekkala
- Preceded by: Urho Kekkonen
- Succeeded by: Tauno Suontausta

Personal details
- Born: Eino Oskari Pekkala; 29 November 1887 Seinäjoki, Grand Duchy of Finland
- Died: 30 September 1956 (aged 68) Helsinki, Finland
- Party: Socialist Electoral Organisation of Workers and Smallholders; Finnish People's Democratic League
- Spouses: Salme Murrik (m. 1913; div. 1924) Mary Moorhouse (m. 1928)
- Relations: Mauno Pekkala (brother)
- Education: University of Helsinki
- Occupation: Lawyer

Eino Oskari Pekkala (29 November 1887 − 30 September 1956) was a Finnish lawyer and politician. He was a member of the Parliament of Finland, representing the Socialist Electoral Organisation of Workers and Smallholders 1927–1930 and the Finnish People's Democratic League 1945–1948. In the 1920−1930s, Pekkala was twice in prison for his political activities, and he was even kidnapped by the fascist Lapua Movement in 1930. As the political situation in Finland changed after the World War II, Pekkala was the Minister of Education 1945–1946, and the Minister of Justice 1946–1948.

In his youth, Pekkala was a talented athlete. His greatest achievements were three Finnish Championship titles in decathlon.

His brother was the Prime Minister of Finland Mauno Pekkala.

== Life ==
=== Early years ===
Eino Pekkala was born in 1887 to the family of the park ranger Johan Oskari Pekkala (1864–1939) and Amanda Matilda Grönroos (1864–1925). In 1888, the family moved to Sysmä, and since 1898, Johan Pekkala worked for the Teiskola Manor in Teisko. The family had four children. They were educated in Tampere, where Pekkala graduated from the high school in 1906.

Pekkala entered the University of Helsinki and finished his master's degree in 1911. After working as a teacher in Tampere and Hämeenlinna, he re-entered the University of Helsinki in 1916 for law studies. Pekkala did not participate the 1918 Finnish Civil War although he was active in the Social Democratic movement. Instead of joining the Reds, Pekkala finished his studies. After the war, Pekkala and Väinö Hakkila opened a law firm in Helsinki to help the captured Red Guard fighters.

=== In the politics ===
In 1919, Pekkala was one of the key figures of the left-wing opposition of the Social Democratic Party which soon became the Socialist Workers' Party of Finland. In May 1920, Pekkala was arrested, and given a 1,5-year sentence for his activism in the Komintern-related party. Since 1926, Pekkala and Asser Salo had a law firm in Helsinki. In the late 1920s, Pekkala was active in the Left Group of Finnish Workers which criticized the underground Communist Party of Finland. In the 1927 parliamentary election, Pekkala was elected to the parliament as a member of the Socialist Electoral Organisation of Workers and Smallholders (STPV).

On 5 July 1930, the fascist Lapua Movement kidnapped Pekkala and Jalmari Rötkö from the meeting of the Constitutional Law Committee and took them to their headquarters at Lapua. On the following day, Pekkala and Rötkö were handed over to the authorities, after the Minister of Interior E. V. Kuokkanen gave an order to arrest all 23 STPV parliamentarians. As the anti-Communist laws were passed, Pekkala was given a 3-year sentence in November 1930 for an intent to commit a treason. In July 1933, Pekkala took part on a hunger strike in the Tammisaari forced labour camp. The strike ended as five political prisoners died of forced feeding.

After his release, Pekkala worked as a lawyer in Helsinki. During the World War II, he assisted arrested Communists and activists of the anti-war resistance. His clients included Pellervo Takatalo, Aimo Rikka and Martta Koskinen who were all given the capital punishment. Pekkala managed to change Takatalo's and Rikka's sentences for life in prison, but Koskinen was executed in September 1943.

As the war was over, the Communist organizations were legalized, and Pekkala was re-elected to the Parliament in the 1945 parliamentary election representing the Finnish People's Democratic League. In 1945–1946 he served as the Minister of Education, and 1946–1948 as the Minister of Justice. In 1946–1947, Pekkala was a member of the special court of the War-responsibility trials set by the Allies. Pekkala left the politics in 1948, and ran a law firm in Helsinki until his death in September 1956.

== Sports ==
Pekkala won 16 medals in the Finnish Championships in Athletics between 1907 and 1911. He was the triple champion of decathlon (1907, 1909 and 1910), and the silver medalist of 110 metres hurdles (1910–1911). In 1919, Pekkala was a founder of the Finnish Workers' Sports Federation, and served as its first chairman until 1927. He was also a member of the organizing committee of the 1952 Summer Olympics.

== Personal life ==
Pekkala was married to the Estonian communist Salme Murrik from 1913 to 1924. In 1928, he married the British communist Mary Moorhouse. Their daughter Salme Anne Pekkala (b. 1928) was married to the diplomat Risto Hyvärinen.
