= Hella Wuolijoki =

Estonian-born Finnish writer

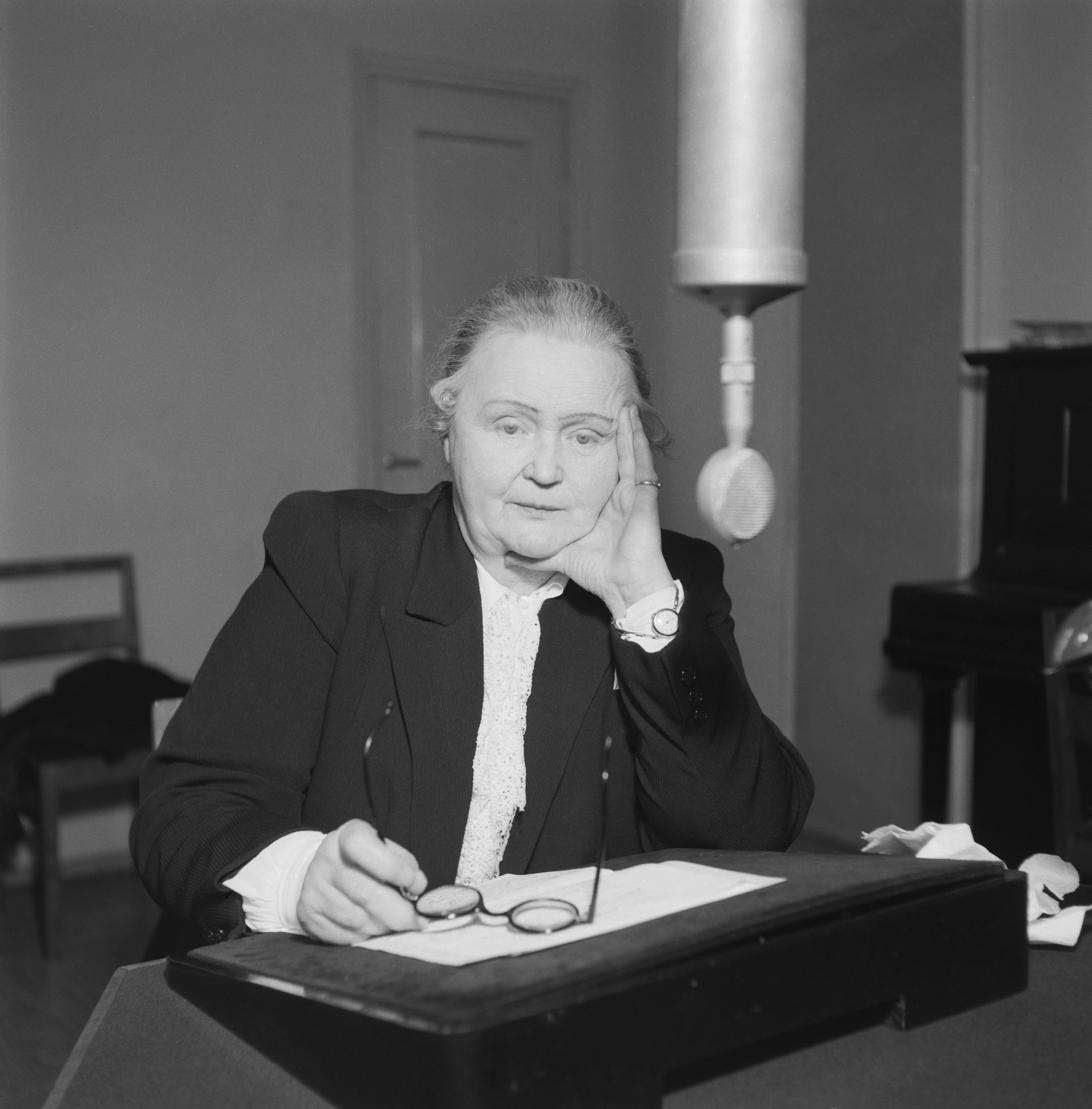
- Wuolijoki in 1946

Director General of Yle
- In office April 1945 – June 1949
- Preceded by: J. V. Vakio
- Succeeded by: Einar Sundström

Personal details
- Born: Ella Maria Murrik; 22 July 1886 Ala, Helme Parish, Governorate of Livonia, Russian Empire (now Estonia)
- Died: 2 February 1954 (aged 67) Helsinki, Finland
- Spouse: Sulo Wuolijoki (m. 1907; div. 1924)
- Children: 1
- Relatives: Salme Pekkala-Dutt (sister); Sakari Tuomioja (son-in-law); Erkki Tuomioja (grandson); R. Palme Dutt (brother-in-law); Eino Pekkala (ex-brother-in-law)
- Education: Imperial Alexander University, 1908
- Occupation: Writer; playwright; parliamentarian; businessperson; farmer
- Writing career
- Pen name: Juhani Tervapää
- Language: Finnish; Estonian

Hella Maria Wuolijoki (née Ella Maria Murrik; 22 July 1886 – 2 February 1954), known by the pen name Juhani Tervapää, was an Estonian-born Finnish writer, playwright, parliamentarian, businessperson and farmer. She is best known as a dramatist, particularly for the Niskavuori series of plays and for her collaboration with Bertolt Brecht on Mr Puntila and his Man Matti. Wuolijoki served as the Director General of Yle from April 1945 to June 1949 and was a member of the Parliament of Finland from 1946 to 1948. She also played a private role in the peace negotiations during the Winter War through her friendship with Alexandra Kollontai.

== Early life and education ==
Ella Murrik was born on 22 July 1886 in Ala, Governorate of Livonia (present-day Estonia) to Ernst Murrik and Katarina Kokamägi. One of five siblings, Wuolijoki was the elder sister of Salme Pekkala-Dutt, a member of the Communist Party of Great Britain.

Wuolijoki attended school in Tartu. In 1904, Wuolijoki moved to Helsinki to study folklore, history and Russian at the Imperial Alexander University. During this period Wuolijoki participated in the 1905 general strike. Wuolijoki graduated in 1908, making her the first Estonian woman to graduate from the university with a Master's degree. Wuolijoki began a PhD in Estonian folklore under the supervision of Kaarle Krohn, but did not complete her studies.

== Career ==
=== Business career ===
Wuolijoki initially worked as a journalist and by giving private Russian language lessons. In April 1906, Wuolijoki was one of two female journalists to cover the first State Duma.

In the 1910s (Note: Also cited as 1920s.) Wuolijoki began working as a secretary for an international trade agent before being an agent herself. The outbreak of the First World War opened a wide field for her organisational skills: public and private property was transferred between countries on paper and partly in practice through her mediation, earning her substantial commission fees. Wuolijoki later operated her own trading firm, and traded primarily in sugar, coffee, wheat and timber from South America, Sweden and the United States. During the early years of the Russian Revolution Wuolijoki was the only Western woman trade agent operating in present-day Russia. Her trading activities extended from sawmill companies in eastern Finland to English firms with an emphasis on the timber trade, but these ventures collapsed during the Great Depression.

Among Wuolijoki's new acquaintances during the war years was Harold Granville Grenfell, the British naval attaché in Saint Petersburg and a member of the left wing of the British Labour Party, whose contacts opened connections for Wuolijoki to British politics.

=== Author ===
Wuolijoki's first play, Talulapsed, was published in 1912 and staged the following spring at the Estonia Theatre in Reval (Tallinn), but was banned immediately after its premiere on political grounds for being too nationalist; the Finnish-language version Talon lapset met the same fate at Kansan näyttämö two years later. Her novel Udutagused (1914) has been regarded as her principal Estonian-language work, and her poetic work Sõja laul (1915), based on Jakob Hurt's collection of folk poetry, later became known internationally as a fragment incorporated into Bertolt Brecht's The Caucasian Chalk Circle.

From the 1930s onwards, Wuolijoki's themes and settings were located in Finland. In 1933, the Ministry of Justice banned her play Laki ja järjestys (Law and Order) after its first performance; the play dealt with the Finnish Civil War and showed sympathy for both sides, and press debate about it cemented perceptions of Wuolijoki's left-wing sympathies.

Given her reputation, Wuolijoki concealed her identity when she offered her next play, Niskavuoren naiset (The Women of Niskavuori), which premiered in 1936 at the Kansanteatteri under the pseudonym Juhani Tervapää; she used this pseudonym for all her works during the remainder of the 1930s. Under director Eino Salmelainen, the elderly matriarch of the Niskavuori estate emerged as the most compelling figure in the triangle drama, and Wuolijoki had by the late 1930s become the most successful playwright in Finland. The series continued with Niskavuoren leipä (1938), Niskavuoren nuori emäntä (1940), Niskavuoren Heta (1950), and the post-war Entäs nyt, Niskavuori. Wuolijoki also wrote two servant-girl narratives during the 1930s, Juurakon Hulda and Justiina; Juurakon Hulda was later adapted into the script for the American film The Farmer's Daughter.

Several of Wuolijoki's plays were performed outside Finland as early as the 1930s, particularly in Estonia. Minister ja kommunist was staged at the Blancheteatern in Stockholm, and The Women of Niskavuori was performed in Sweden, Norway, Denmark, Germany and England.

Bertolt Brecht stayed as a refugee in Finland with his family for over a year from April 1940, awaiting a visa to the United States. During the summer at Wuolijoki's estate Marlebäck, she read her rejected folk comedy Sahanpuruprinsessa (The Sawdust Princess) aloud in German to the family, and she and Brecht decided to submit it to a Finnish playwriting competition. They reworked the text and signed an agreement establishing copyright and the use of both authors' names in future versions. The entry submitted to the competition, Iso-Heikkilän isäntä ja hänen renkinsä Kalle, was Wuolijoki's own Finnish adaptation of Sahanpuruprinsessa in Brecht's version; Brecht's Mr Puntila and his Man Matti is a later version based on Wuolijoki's original text along with other recollections from that summer at Marlebäck, and has only rarely been performed under both names as stipulated in the agreement. Brecht scholars have tended to downplay Wuolijoki's contribution because they have been unable to engage with her broader Finnish-language output.

=== Political activity ===
In the 1920s and 1930s, Wuolijoki hosted a literary and political salon at Jungfrustigen 2 A in Helsinki that discussed culture and promoted left-wing ideas. In the years following the Finnish Civil War, the salon transmitted information to representatives of the Entente Powers and eased the fate of the losing side; the information conveyed by Wuolijoki and the Finnish left-wing intellectuals who visited the salon, including Väinö Tanner, has been traced in the background of debates in the British House of Commons. By the late 1920s the salon's importance declined, and Wuolijoki's gatherings moved to her estate Marlebäck in Iitti, which she had bought in 1920.

In a letter to Foreign Minister Väinö Tanner at Christmas 1939, Wuolijoki referred to her friendship with the Soviet envoy in Stockholm, Alexandra Kollontai, and offered to hold private discussions with her. The inner circle of the Finnish government approved the proposal, knowing that Wuolijoki was familiar to the Allies and not compromised in Soviet eyes. Wuolijoki travelled to Stockholm to meet Kollontai, but also held parallel discussions with Soviet interior ministry agents Boris Yartsev and Andrei Grauer. These contacts formed an important link in the chain of events leading to the end of the Winter War.

After the war, Wuolijoki's wartime efforts increased her influence. Andrei Zhdanov, chairman of the Allied Control Commission, met her within days of his arrival in Finland. Wuolijoki has been regarded as one of the founders of the Finland–Soviet Union Society and of the Finnish People's Democratic League (SKDL), and as a background force behind J. K. Paasikivi's government; as a foreign-born citizen she could not herself be appointed as a minister. She served in parliament from 1946 to 1948 as a representative of the SKDL.

=== Director General of Yle ===
Wuolijoki served as Director General of Yle from April 1945 to June 1949; her appointment was one of the personnel changes regarded as politically necessary after the war, made at the request of the Council of State though formally by a decision of Yle. According to the BLF, this was the most colourful period of her life. Wuolijoki sought to actively shape the direction of broadcasting and made her voice heard literally as well as figuratively, with listeners soon learning to recognise it on air. Her ideology manifested in a strengthening of public debate and a favouring of People's Democratic thinking, but also in a commitment to popular education through high culture. The new programme Pienoisparlamentti (Miniature Parliament) conveyed the views of political opinion-formers, and the Radio Theatre under Olavi Paavolainen had the largest theatre audience in the country.

Wuolijoki was both appointed and dismissed for political reasons. Pressure from those excluded from broadcasting was significant in the process that led in autumn 1948 to the "lex Jahvetti", which transferred the election of Yle's administrative council to parliament. Political conditions had shifted, and the new administrative council dismissed her. Nevertheless, some of the changes she had introduced remained part of Yle's operations.

== Arrest and imprisonment ==
Wuolijoki's connections to the Soviet Union caused suspicion during the Continuation War. In May 1943, Wuolijoki was arrested following a confession by the Soviet agent Kerttu Nuorteva, who claimed that Wuolijoki was operating as her secret contact in Finland. Wuolijoki was then charged with treason and sentenced to life imprisonment. During her imprisonment Wuolijoki was held in solitary confinement by the State Police and then at Helsinki County Prison. The prison years of 1943–1944 forced Wuolijoki to pause, and during this time she began writing her memoirs of the early twentieth century.

In September 1944, Wuolijoki was released following the Moscow Armistice.

== Personal life ==
In 1907 (Note: Also cited as 1908.), Wuolijoki married Sulo Wuolijoki, a Finnish lawyer, journalist and politician. By 1917 the couple had separated and later divorced in 1924. The couple had one daughter, the writer Vappu Tuomioja.

Wuolijoki was the mother-in-law of Sakari Tuomioja, a politician and diplomat, and the grandmother of the politician Erkki Tuomioja. Through her sister Salme, Wuolijoki was the sister-in-law of R. Palme Dutt and the former sister-in-law of Eino Pekkala.

On 2 February 1954 Wuolijoki died in Helsinki, aged 67.

== Selected works ==
=== Memoirs ===
- Enkä ollut vanki – tuokiokuvia vankilasta, Tammi 1944
- Koulutyttönä Tartossa, (1945)
- Yliopistovuodet Helsingissä, (1945)
- Kummituksia ja kajavia, (1947)
- Minusta tuli liikenainen, (1953)

=== Plays ===
- Talulapsed (Talon lapset) (1912)
- Koidula (1932)
- Minister ja kommunist (1932)
- Laki ja järjestys (1932)
- Kulkurivalssi (under the pseudonym Feliks Tuli)
- Palava maa (1936)
- Niskavuoren naiset (1936)
- Juurakon Hulda (1937)
- Justiina (1937)
- Naiset ja naamarit (1937)
- Vihreä kulta (1938)
- Niskavuoren leipä (1939)
- Vastamyrkky (1939)
- Niskavuoren nuori emäntä (1940)
- Kuningas hovinarrina (1945)
- Tuntematon tuomari (1945)
- Häjynpuoleisia pikkunäytelmiä (1945)
- Niskavuoren Heta (1950)
- Entäs nyt, Niskavuori? (1953)

Her other works include novels and screenplays, several based on her own plays.
