= Carolus Lassila =

Finnish diplomat (1922–1987)

Carolus Juhani Lassila (5 August 1922 – 26 October 1987) was a Finnish diplomat.

Lassila was born in Helsinki, Finland in 1922 to parents Armas Lassila, Managing Director (1890–1955) and Martha Sofia Holmberg (1888–1975). His uncles were Väinö Lassila, Professor of Anatomy, and Ilmo Lassila, Professor of Forest Technology. Carolus Lassila was married to Britta Synnöve Juliana Wilskman (1923–1987), they had two children and six grandchildren.

Lassila was an expert in Arabic language and Arab culture. He was Ambassador to Beirut, Lebanon from 1968 to 1974, during which period he was also co-accredited as Ambassador to Kuwait 1969–1975, Jeddah, Saudi Arabia 1971 as well as Amman, Jordan 1972–1974. After Lebanon he was Ambassador to Jeddah, Saudi Arabia from 1975–1977 and co-accredited as Ambassador to Doha, Qatar 1974, Manama, Bahrain 1975, Muscat, Oman 1975, and Abu Dhabi, United Arab Emirates 1975. Most recently Ambassador to Madrid, Spain 1984–1987 as well as Morocco.

Carolus Lassila and his wife died in a flash river flood in the Atlas Mountains of Morocco on their way from Ouarzazate to Taznakht, 400 kilometers south of Rabat on 26 October 1987.
