= Väinö Lassila =

Finnish physician, anthropologist, professor and human rights activist

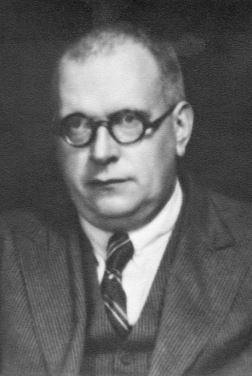
- Born: 9 March 1896; Pori, Grand Duchy of Finland
- Died: 11 April 1939 (aged 43); Helsinki, Finland
- Education: University of Helsinki
- Scientific career
- Fields: anatomy, anthropology

Väinö David Lassila (9 March 1896 – 11 April 1939) was a Finnish physician, anatomist, and anthropologist who was a professor of anatomy at the University of Helsinki. He was the leading authority of the Finnish racial studies, but since the mid-1930s, Lassila dissociated himself from racial theories and became one of the prominent figures of Finland's human rights movement.

== Life and career ==
Lassila graduated from the Pori Lyceum in 1914 and studied medicine at the University of Helsinki. Since 1918, Lassila worked as an assistant at the Department of Anatomy completing his medical degree in 1922. Lassila's early work was influenced by the professor Yrjö Kajava and the Swedish anatomist Gustaf Retzius. In his 1921 doctoral thesis, Lassila studied Sámi skulls collected from Lapland in the late 19th century.

After Kajava's death in 1930, Lassila was appointed the professor of anatomy and introduced to the Finnish Academy of Science and Letters. Lassila was in charge of the academy's anthropological program launched to indicate that the Finns were a "culture race", instead of an "inferior race" related to Mongols as the Swedish and German race theorists claimed. In 1933–1934, Lassila, Yngve Roschier and Paavo Ravila ran field expeditions in Lapland, studying the Skolts and digging skulls from an ancient cemetery island in the Lake Inari.

Lassila started questioning prevalent theories after participating the 1934 International Congress of Anthropological and Ethnological Sciences in London. He got acquainted with the Nazi race theories and found them pseudoscientific. Lassila now regarded racial theories as outdated and scientifically inconsequential. He also criticised racial hierarchies which lacked any scientific basis and were used as a theoretical basis for European expansion and imperialism.

In the fall of 1934, Lassila got involved with the Finnish human rights movement. He was a founding member of the Committee Against the Capital Punishment which soon became the League of Human Rights (Ihmisoikeuksien Liitto). Lassila was its chairman until his death. In 1935, Lassila testified for Toivo Antikainen in a murder trial that raised an international attention. He was also the leading critic of the 1935 passed compulsory sterilization act. Instead of sterilizations, Lassila spoke for public social and health care.

In the late 1930s, Lassila was one of the key figures of the Finnish Popular front movement together with Mary Rhodes Moorhouse and Erkki Vala. He was a member of the Helsinki City Council representing the liberal National Progressive Party. According to the State Police, Lassila's campaign for the 1936 parliamentary election was financed by the exile Communist Party of Finland. His name was also included in a State Police memoir that was made public in September 1936 causing the resignation of the Kivimäki Cabinet.

Väinö Lassila died of pneumonia in April 1939.

== Family ==
Lassila's brother was the professor Ilmo Lassila. Their nephew was the diplomat Carolus Lassila.

== Works ==
- Beobachtungen an Schadelnähten bei Lappen : Eine anthropologische Studie über die Nähte des Neurocraniums. Helsinki: Duodecim. 1921.
- Der Aortenbogen und sich ihm abzweigenden grossen Arterienstämme nebst deren Verhältnis zu den Nervi sympathicus, vagus und recurrens bei den Säugern : Vergleichend-anatomische Untersuchungen. Helsinki: Finnish Academy of Science. 1927.
- Über die Verteilung der subkutanen Venen der oberen Extremität bei der Bevölkerung in Suomi. Helsinki: Finnish Academy of Science. 1927.
- Beiträge zur Kenntnis der Entwicklung und Verknöcherung des sogenannten Fugenknorpels. Helsinki: Finnish Academy of Science. 1928.
- Anthropologische Untersuchungen über die Form und das Leistenrelief der Fusssohle bei der Bevölkerung in Suomi. Helsinki: Finnish Academy of Science. 1929.
- Lassila, Väinö; Mustakallio, Martti J.: Die Trachea der Edentata : eine vergleichend-anatomische Studie. Helsinki: University of Helsinki. 1929.
- Lassila, Väinö; Rancken, Dodo: Ihmisen anatomia ja fysiologia. Helsinki: WSOY. 1934.
