= Kerttu Nuorteva =

Soviet spy

Kerttu Nuorteva (November 10, 1912 in Astoria, Oregon, United States – August 29, 1963 in Karaganda, Kazakh Soviet Socialist Republic, Soviet Union) was a Soviet intelligence agent. She was the daughter of Santeri Nuorteva, the president of the Karelian Autonomous Soviet Socialist Republic, and was parachuted into Finland by the Soviet Airborne Troops in 1942. She was arrested and deported to the Soviet Union at the end of the war.

== Family and education ==
Nuorteva was born in Astoria, Oregon, United States, where her father had lived since the 1910s, after moving from Tampere, Finland. In 1920, her father first moved to Canada, then to England, from where he was deported to Soviet Russia that same year. In the Soviet Union, Santeri had a good relationship with Lenin and became the president of Karelian Autonomous Soviet Socialist Republic.

Kerttu Nuorteva was raised and went to school in Petrozavodsk and later attended university in Leningrad. She married the Finnish-born Jalmari Aho, a member of the Finnish Red Guards. She later married a journalist, Leo Varshavski.

In 1937, Nuorteva was accused of treason and arrested by the NKVD. She was held for two years and then sentenced to three years at hard labor.

During the Second World War, in December 1941, the NKVD suggested that she could join intelligence training and sent her on a mission to Finland. Her brothers Matti and Pentti had been sent on similar missions, but both were arrested in occupied Petrozavodsk and executed by the Finnish forces.

== Mission in Finland ==
Nuorteva parachuted into Vihti on March 30, 1942. Her mission was to acquire information about the German troops in Finland and the political sentiment there.

She was to make contact with the Social Democratic politician Väinö Tanner. For equipment, she had a radio transmitter. One of her two contacts was the playwright and politician Hella Wuolijoki, whose code name was "the Poet." Her jump was not well targeted, and she was dropped 100 km to the west of her final destination. Her parachute became trapped in a spruce tree, and she injured her foot as she disentangled herself. After the jump, she managed to find only the radio transmitter, and her other equipment were missing.

Nuorteva hid in a barn and ate chocolate and biscuits. The wrappers of the chocolate with Russian-language text were later found, as well as a small tube of lipstick, which was used as evidence that a woman had been there. A Russian-language map of Southern Finland with markings was also found.

A beautiful and well-dressed woman got a ride from a young boy to the center of Vihti. Her presence had already been noted earlier and she was suspected of being a "desant," as Soviet spies and saboteurs parachuted into Finland were called. The jump place was located, but the boy who had given Nuorteva a ride lied about her description.

Nuorteva's undercover mission was to work as a trainee cosmetician in a beauty salon in Aleksanterinkatu, Helsinki. Nuorteva's residence was located at Vuorimiehenkatu 19, in the district of Ullanlinna. Nuorteva was discovered when her radio transmitter was found in a bag that she had left in a local laundry. Nuorteva was arrested on September 7, 1942, as she came back to retrieve her radio.

== Sentenced and prison time ==
Finnish Security Police Valpo and Military Headquarters arranged her interrogation, but Nuorteva was silent for many months. She told her story only when the chief of the Turku office of Valpo, Paavo Kastari, brought Arvo "Poika" Tuominen, an old friend of her father and a member of the Communist Party of Finland who had begun to help the Finnish police, to the interrogations to talk with her.

Tuominen succeeded in convincing her that Stalinism had betrayed and destroyed communism and managed to crack her ideology. Nuorteva's worldview broke down, and psychologically broken, she confessed everything. Nuorteva was in medical treatment for two months for mental problems.

Nuorteva's information led to arrest of 11 persons, including Hella Wuolijoki. Heikki Teerikangas, who had helped her to hide, was sentenced to death. Wuolijoki got a life sentence in penitentiary. Other persons got lesser sentences.

Nuorteva was sentenced in field court to capital punishment, which was confirmed by a court-martial. Relatives of Nuorteva, including her father's cousin, Professor Paul Nyberg, managed to postpone the execution.

In prison, Finnish Security Police arranged the author Yrjö Kivimies to talk with Nuorteva. After the talks, Kivimies wrote her memoir under the pen name Irja Niemi, which was in 1944 published by Oy Suomen Kirja. The name of the book was Neuvostokasvatti.

In 1944, Nuorteva was for a second time in medical treatment for mental problems, and during that time, she made a doll using her own hair. The doll is in Joroinen Defence Museum.

Nuorteva was offered a chance to move to a western country in the autumn of 1944. She decided not to leave and was deported to the Soviet Union in 1944. She went to live in Petropavlovsk, in Kazakhstan, and in 1947, she was sentenced to ten years in the gulag. After her release in 1954, she studied construction engineering and worked at hydroelectric power stations. Nuorteva died in Karaganda in 1963 after she had suffered from meningitis.

In 2009, the Finnish film director Jörn Donner made the film Kuulustelu about Nuorteva's interrogation.
