= Mark Peel (historian) =

Australian historian

Mark Andrew Peel (born 17 October 1959), historian and academic, was the Director of Educational Innovation at the University of Leicester until retiring in 2019. He also served the university as Provost (from 2015 to 2017), Pro Vice Chancellor (Student Experience) and Head of the College of Arts, Humanities and Law. Before going to Leicester, he was Professor of Modern Cultural and Social History and Head of the School of the Arts at the University of Liverpool and a Professor and Head of the School of Historical Studies in the Faculty of Arts at Monash University in Australia. He holds degrees from Flinders University (BA (Hons), 1980 and MA, 1983), Johns Hopkins University (MA, 1985) and Melbourne University (PhD, 1993) and was appointed a full professor in 2007. He was elected as a Fellow of the Academy of Social Sciences in Australia in 2008 and became a Fellow of the Royal Historical Society in 2010.

Peel's interest in student transition to university education led to a report in the federal government's Higher Education Series in 1999 and a research project on school-leavers' experiences of university teaching. Peel has also contributed to debates about history teaching and curriculum, especially through his paper "The Essentials of Australian History", which formed part of the 1999 National Inquiry into School History, through his work as an advisor on Australian history to the Victorian Curriculum and Assessment Authority and through two surveys on university curricula and teaching for the Australian Historical Association. In 2008, the Australian Learning and Teaching Council awarded him one of its Citations for Outstanding Contributions to Student Learning, for "sustained contributions to the imaginative teaching of history, and to the transition, progress and welfare of students in his own and other universities". In the same year, he was also awarded one of three Vice-Chancellor's Awards for Teaching Excellence at Monash.

== Books ==
- Good Times, Hard Times: The Past and the Future in Elizabeth (Melbourne University Press, 1995. Shortlisted for The Age Non-Fiction Book of the Year Award);
- A Little History of Australia (Melbourne University Press, 1997).
- Kleine Geschichte Australiens (Deutscher Taschenbuch Verlag, 2000).
- The Lowest Rung: Voices of Australian Poverty (Cambridge University Press, 2003. Shortlisted for the Victorian Premier's Literary Awards)
- Miss Cutler and the Case of the Resurrected Horse: Social Work and the Story of Poverty in America, Australia, and Britain (University of Chicago Press, 2011).
- A History of Australia (Palgrave Macmillan, 2011, with Christina Twomey, second edition, 2017).
