= Tomi Pekkala =

Finnish ice hockey player

- Born: November 19, 1988 (age 36); Rovaniemi, Finland
- Height: 5 ft 10 in (178 cm)
- Weight: 218 lb (99 kg; 15 st 8 lb)
- Position: Forward
- Shot: Left
- Played for: Oulun Karpat; Tappara; Lahti Pelicans
- Playing career: 2008–2014

Tomi Pekkala is a Finnish ice hockey player who previously played in Finland for the Lahti Pelicans of the SM-liiga.
