= Mauno Pekkala =

Finnish politician (1890–1952)

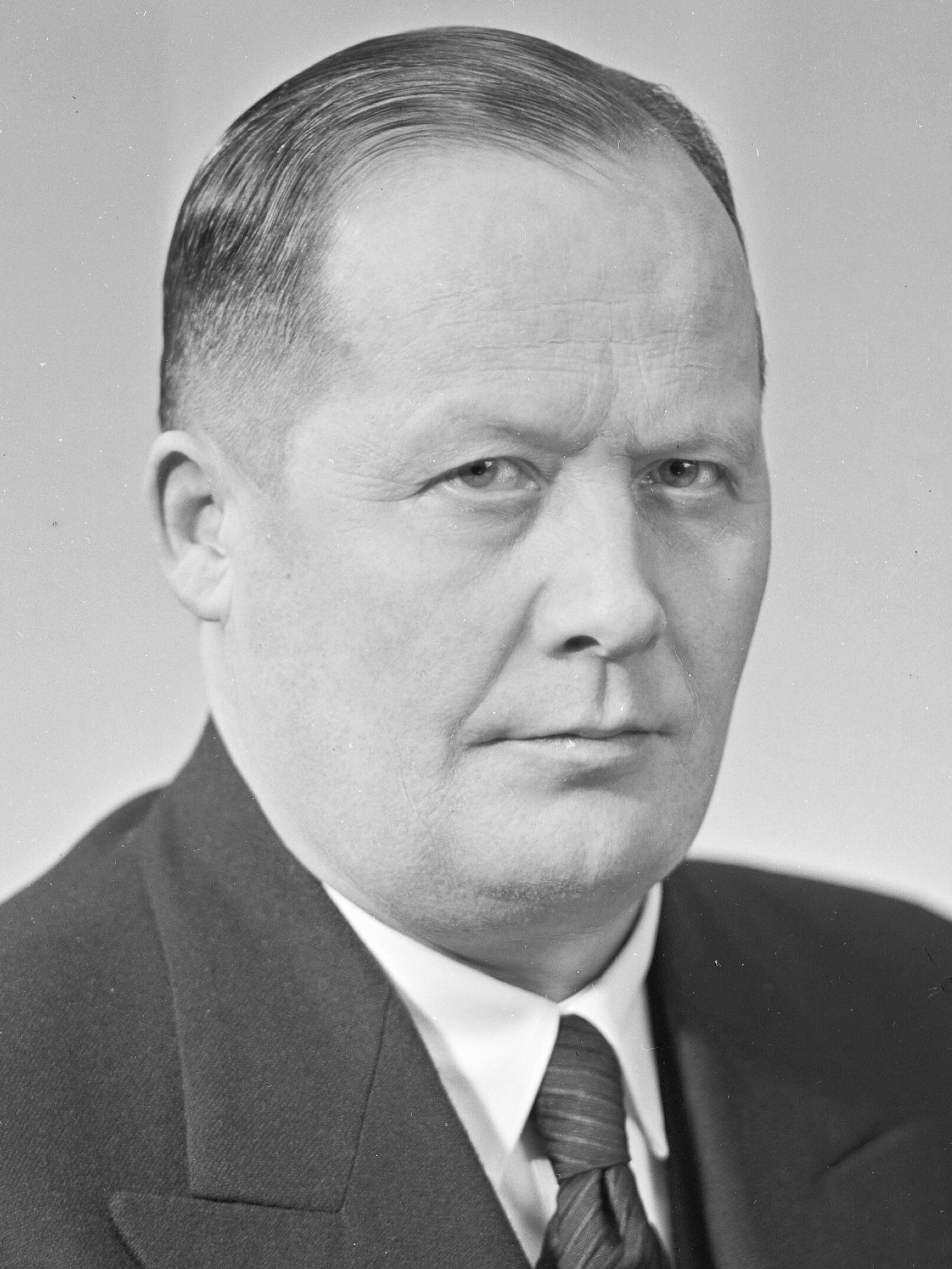

19th Prime Minister of Finland
- In office 26 March 1946 – 29 July 1948
- President: Juho K. Paasikivi
- Preceded by: Juho K. Paasikivi
- Succeeded by: Karl-August Fagerholm

Minister of Defence
- In office 17 April 1945 – 27 March 1946
- Prime Minister: Juho K. Paasikivi; Himself
- Preceded by: Väinö Valve
- Succeeded by: Yrjö Kallinen

Minister of Finance
- In office 1 December 1939 – 22 May 1942
- Prime Minister: Risto Ryti; Johan W. Rangell
- Preceded by: Väinö Tanner
- Succeeded by: Väinö Tanner

Minister of Agriculture
- In office 13 December 1926 – 17 December 1927
- Prime Minister: Väinö Tanner
- Preceded by: Juho Sunila
- Succeeded by: Sigurd Mattsson

Personal details
- Born: 27 January 1890 Sysmä, Finland
- Died: 30 June 1952 (aged 62) Helsinki, Finland
- Party: Social Democratic (1927–1945); People’s Democratic League (1945–1952)
- Relations: Eino Pekkala (brother)

Mauno Pekkala (27 January 1890 – 30 June 1952) was a Finnish statesman and politician who served as Prime Minister from 1946 to 1948. Mauno Pekkala was the brother of Eino Pekkala.

Pekkala was a member of the Social Democratic Party of Finland and member of several wartime cabinets as Minister of Finance from December 1939 to February 1942. Pekkala left the party after the Continuation War.

After the war, Pekkala joined the Finnish People's Democratic League (SKDL), an alliance of communists, socialists and social democrats. He served as the Minister of Defence between April 1945 and March 1946.

He was candidate in the 1950 presidential election, but lost to J. K. Paasikivi. Pekkala also belonged to the Socialist Unity Party which worked inside the SKDL.

== Cabinets ==
- Pekkala Cabinet

Political offices
Preceded by Juho Kusti Paasikivi	Prime Minister of Finland; 1946–1948	Succeeded by Karl-August Fagerholm
