= Erkki Kuokkanen =

Finnish politician

Erkki Veikko Kuokkanen (5 December 1887, Kuopio – 6 March 1956) was a Finnish lawyer and politician. He served as Minister of the Interior from 4 July 1930 to 21 March 1931. Kuokkanen was a Member of the Parliament of Finland from 1927 to 1933, representing the National Coalition Party.
