= Tauno Tiusanen =

Finnish economist (born 1941)

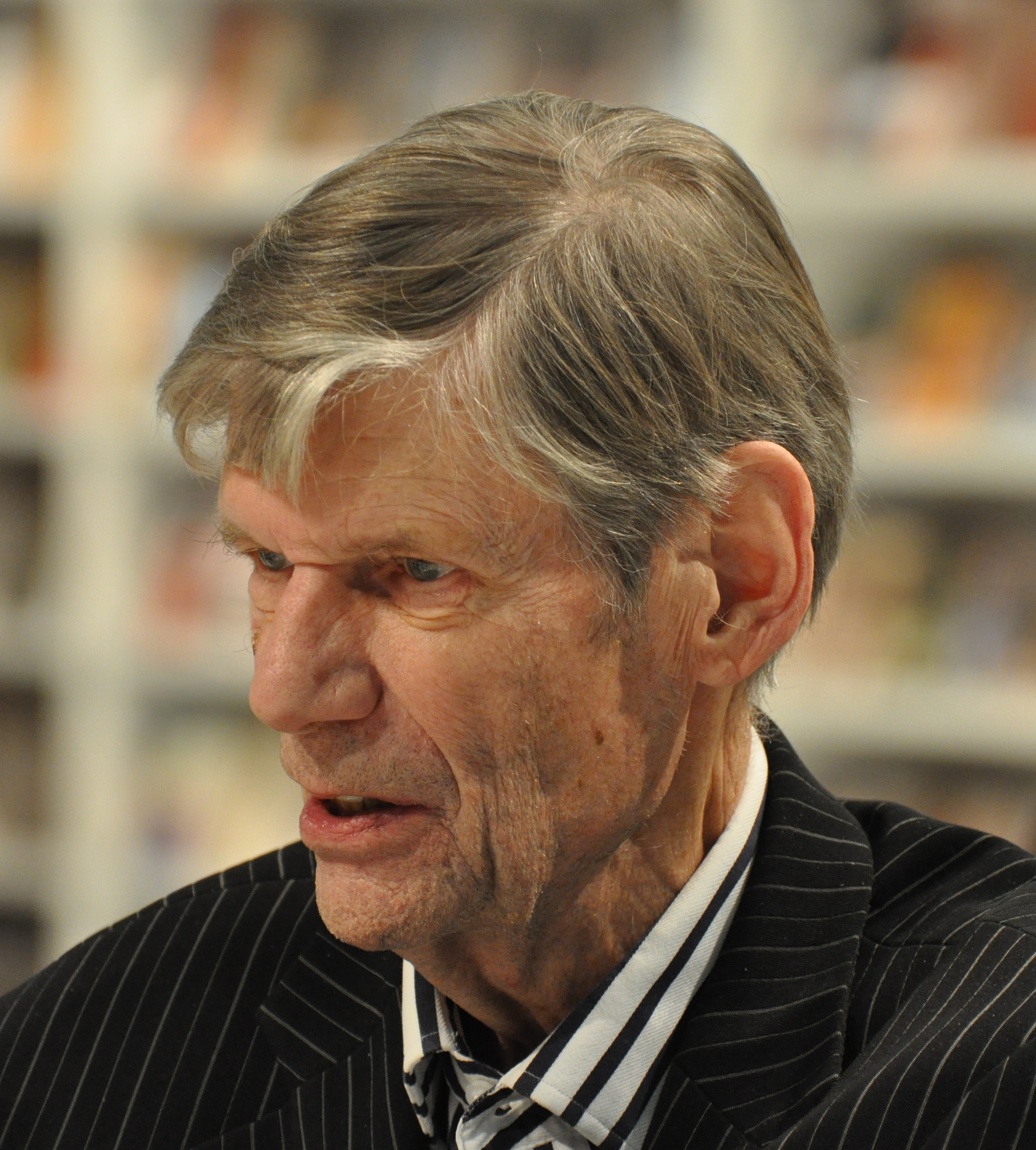
Tauno Tiusanen in 2011

Tauno Tiusanen (born 30 April 1941) is a Finnish economist. Born in Helsinki, he is a professor emeritus of the University of Glasgow and Lappeenranta University of Technology (Finland).

He held the professorship of economics and worked as Director of the Institute of Russian and East European Studies at the University of Glasgow to 1995. He also acted as editor-in-chief of the Europe-Asia Studies.
