= Risto Hyvärinen =

Finnish diplomat (1926–2018)

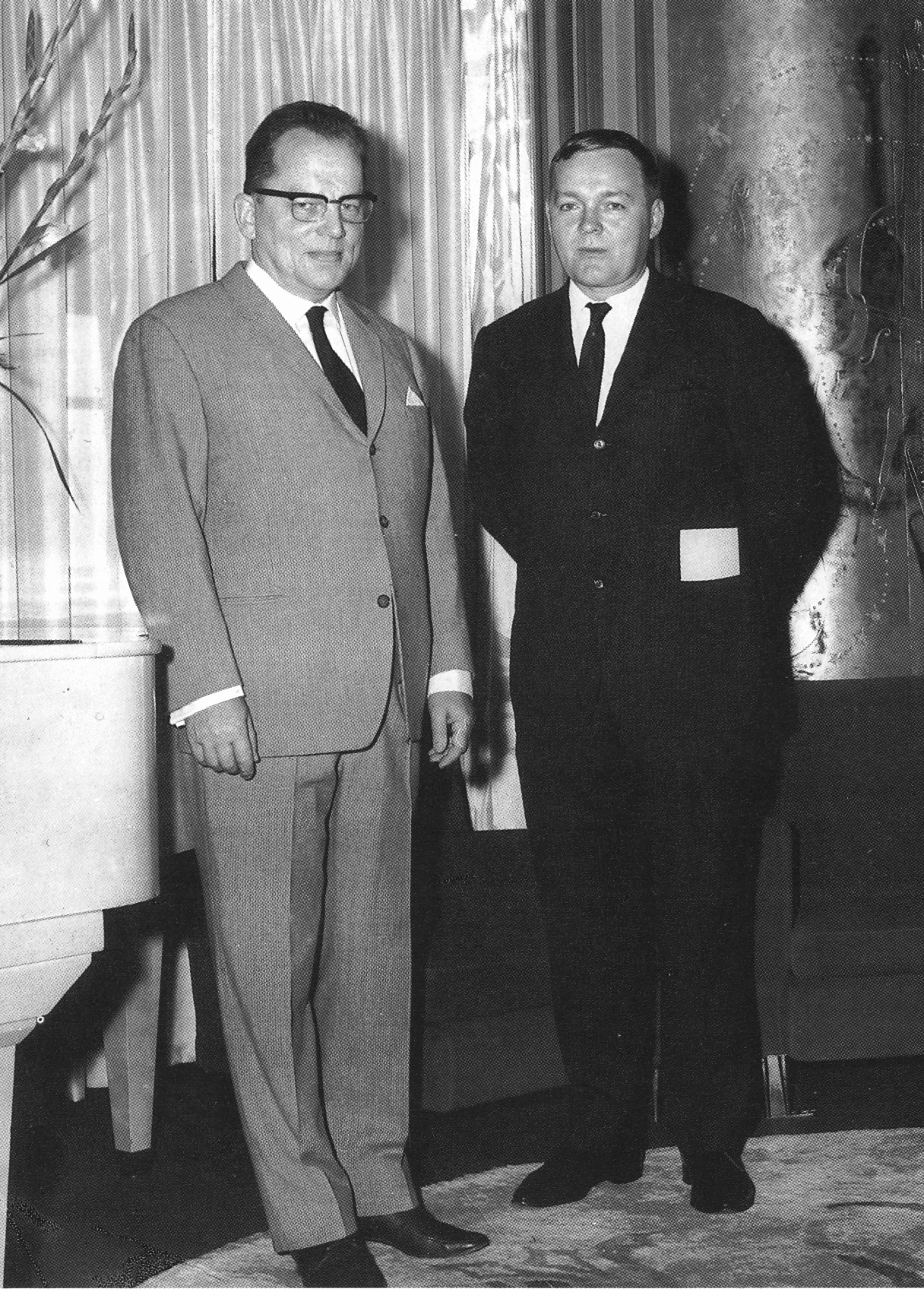
Risto Hyvärinen (right) with Minister of Foreign Affairs Ahti Karjalainen in 1967

Risto Ilmari Antero Hyvärinen (23 April 1926 – 8 March 2018) was a Finnish diplomat, a Doctor of Political Science and a Lieutenant Colonel (1966). He was awarded the post of Special Envoy and Plenipotentiary Minister in 1970. He was Assistant-Secretary-General of the United Nations, Ambassador, Foreign Affairs Counselor.

Hyvärinen was employed by the Defense Forces in 1948–1965 and since 1965 at the Ministry for Foreign Affairs, first head of its Political Department 1967–1972, then Ambassador in Belgrade and Athens from 1972 to 1975. He was the Special Representative of the Secretary-General at the Geneva Disarmament Committee 1975–1979 and Ambassador to New Delhi 1979-1984, Beijing 1984–1989 and Budapest 1989–1992. He has written articles and books on international research. His dissertation was on Hans Morgenthau's Politics Among Nations.
