= Political violence in Finland (1918–1932) =

- Part of the interwar period
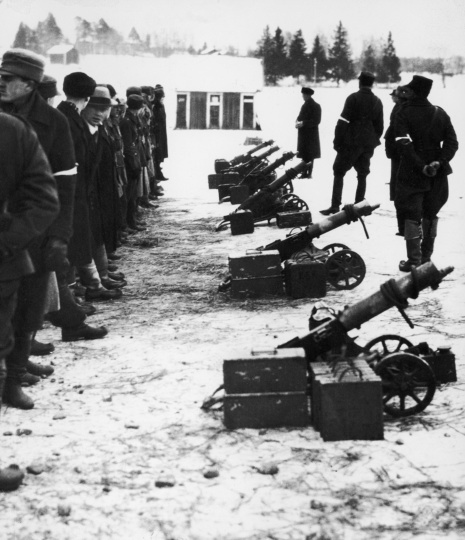
- Lapua movement machine guns
Date	15 May 1918 — 6 March 1932 (13 years, 9 months, 2 weeks and 6 days)
Location	Finland
Result	Finnish government victory: Lapua movement rebellion suppressed; Lapua movement is banned; Many communists arrested

Belligerents
Finland: Finnish Defence Forces; Finnish Border Guard; Police of Finland; Civil Guard; SDP	Far-right: Lapua Movement	Far-left: Red Guards; Communist Party of Finland; Red Guerrilla Battalion of the North; SSTP; SKNL; SPKRP

Finland saw significant political violence from the end of the Finnish Civil War until the Mäntsälä rebellion. The Red Guerrilla Battalion of the North under the Communist Party of Finland, would fight Finnish border guards during the Pork Mutiny. Minister Heikki Ritavuori would be shot dead at the door to his home in Helsinki in February 1922. In 1923, many members of the Socialist Workers' Party of Finland would be arrested. There would be some clashes between Finnish police and the Young Communist League of Finland during protests. The Lapua Movement would find support from the National Coalition Party and the right wing of the Agrarian League. The Lapua Movement would have a show of power during the Vaasa riot and Peasant March. Onni Happonen, a social-democrat, would be arrested and then turned over to a fascist mob and would be killed. The Lapua movement would be banned after the Mäntsälä rebellion.

== Events and incidents ==
- Pork mutiny (1922)
- White Guard Affair (1921)
- Assassination of Heikki Ritavuori (1922)
- Vaasa riot (1930)
- Peasant March (1930)
- Killing of Onni Happonen (1930)
- Ståhlberg kidnapping (1930)
- Mäntsälä rebellion (1932)

== See also ==
- History of Finland
- Finnish Civil War
- Finnish Declaration of Independence
- Timeline of Independence of Finland (1917–1920)
- Kingdom of Finland (1918)
- Political violence in Germany (1918–1933)
- Fascist and anti-Fascist violence in Italy (1919–1926)
