= Vaasa riot =

1930 riot in Vaasa, Finland

- Part of Political violence in Finland (1918–1932)
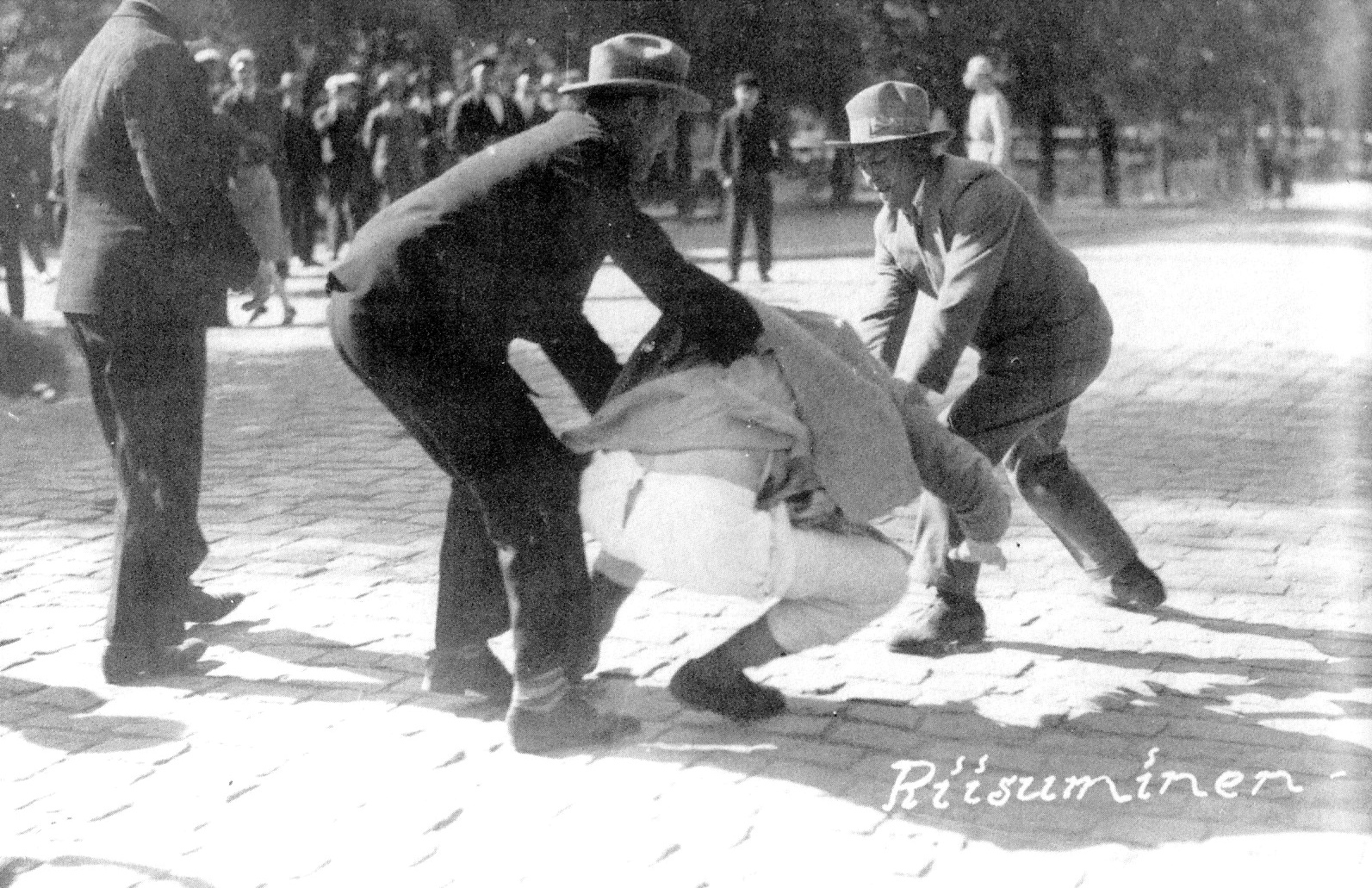
- Members of the Lapua Movement assault Eino Nieminen, the publisher of the left-wing Työn Ääni newspaper, in the Vaasa riot
- Date: 4 June 1930
- Location: Vaasa, Finland

Parties
Lapua Movement	Social democrats, communists, and bystanders

Casualties
- Death: 0
- Injuries: Several
- Outcome: The Lapua Movement kidnaps Asser Salo, and begins engaging in more political violence

The Vaasa riot took place on 4 June 1930 in Vaasa, Finland, when members of the far-right, anti-communist, fascist Lapua Movement violently attacked communist supporters and bystanders at a courthouse in Vaasa. Police did not intervene in the attack.

While there were no fatalities or serious injuries during the attack outside the courthouse, members of the Lapua Movement kidnapped Asser Salo, a Finnish member of Parliament, whom they later violently beat before releasing.

In the aftermath of the riot, the Finnish government blamed the attack on social democrats and ethnic Swedes, passed several anti-communist laws, and met with leadership of the Lapua Movement. The Vaasa riot signaled the defeat of moderate elements in the Lapua Movement, who were widely believed to stand for non-violence and the rule of law. As more radical elements gained control over the Lapua Movement, it began to focus more on acts of violence and political terror in the following months.

== Background ==
The Lapua Movement was a far-right, anti-communist, and fascist movement founded by Vihtori Kosola in 1929. The movement was dissatisfied by the Finnish government and political center's tolerance of social democrats and communists after the 1918 Finnish Civil War.

On 15 March 1930, at the second National Assembly of the Lapua Movement, the moderate wing tried to curb the radicals. At the end of the assembly, The Suomen Lukko was established, which called for opposition to communism through legal means. However, the association's activities could not contain the movement's radical followers from Ostrobothnia.

On 28 March, a group of radical Lapua supporters destroyed the printing press in Vassa of the left-wing Työn Ääni newspaper. Sensing no public backlash after the attacks, the radicals soon took public credit for it. Vihtori Kosola, who had not been one of the planners of the attack, but now set out to support it, became the figurehead of the movement. In the background, there was a struggle between the moderates, mainly from Helsinki, and the radicals.

Seventy-two men stated that they had attacked the Työn Ääni office and five men took responsibility for destroying the presses. In the organ of the Lapuan Movement, Activist, 650 men signed their support for the act. In a message published by Kosola, the Lapua Movement proudly stated it was behind the Työn Ääni attack.

Asser Salo, a lawyer and Communist member of Parliament, filed a lawsuit on behalf of Työn Ääni for damages against the Lapua Movement and some of its members. The initial court date set for the trial was 7 May 7.

The Lapua Movement announced that it would state a demonstration at the court house that day. Esko Riekki, the head of the Detective Etsivä keskuspoliisi (EK), warned the Government of Finland that the demonstration could turn violent. The government asked Lapua to cancel the demonstration, but it refused. In response, the government asked Lapua and the Communists not to bring support forces to the court house. To avoid creating a provocation, the government decided not to impose extra security measures.

On 7 May, when Salo arrived in Vaasa for the court hearing, a group of Lapua supporters attempted to kidnap him in the Seinäjoki train station. In court that day, the hearing date was postposed until June 4th.

== The riot ==
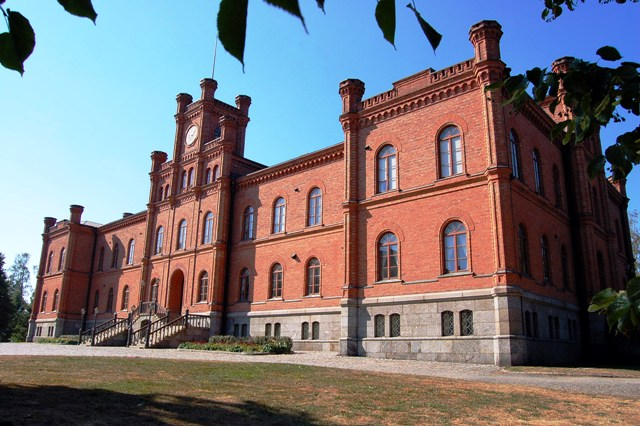
The courthouse in Vaasa

On the morning of 4 June, 1,800 supporters of the Lapua Movement arrived in Vaasa early in the morning with cars decorated with Finnish flags. The procession of 200 cars stopped briefly at the destroyed Työn Ääni office and the governor's official residence.

The group then stopped at a cemetery that contained graves of Lapua supporters. The men sang hymns and listened to speeches that were given.

The next stop that morning was the Vaasa Court of Appeal, where the demonstration began peacefully. However, many members stayed at the courthouse into the afternoon to hear the verdict on the lawsuit.

=== Courthouse attacks ===
On the afternoon of 4 June, Lapua Movement members broke out in violence at the courthouse after its verdict was read. A group of Lapua supporters beat Eino Nieminen, the manager of the printing press of the Työn Ääni, who was invited as a witness.

In the foyer of the second floor of the courthouse, Eino Nieminen got into an argument with several Lapua supporters. As the argument heated up, a Lapua supporter took Eino outside, tore his clothes and beat him. The crowd followed the assault from the sidelines and the police did not intervene.

Vaasa Police Chief Gunnar Tallroth eventually rescued Nieminen and took him to the police station for safety. Soon after Nieminen left the police station, a crowd of Lapua supporters broke in and tried to find him.

The Lapua men beat up ten other leftist supporters, including Allan Asplund, a journalist for the Vaasa-based Swedish language communist newspaper Nya Folkbladet. Several right-wing bystanders who tried to stop the violence were also injured by the attack.

The governor, Bruno Sarlin, came to the scene and tried to stop the violence, but was unsuccessful.

=== Kidnapping of Asser Salo ===
When Asser Salo, a lawyer and Communist member of Parliament, stepped out of the courthouse after the verdict, a group of Lapua men forcible grabbed him and whisked him into a waiting car. The Etsivä keskuspoliisi (EK) police could not stop the abduction. Kosti-Paavo Eerolainen, an EK detective present, later joined the radical wing of the Lapua Movement.

Salo was taken to the Lapua's youth club house, where he was threatened with execution. He was forced to swear that he would never sue Lapua again. After this, the kidnappers took Salo to Viitasaari, where he was released.

== Consequences ==
After the riot, the Finnish Government sent in the military to patrol Vaasa. Due to threats from the Lapua Movement, Työn Ääni did not resume its publications.

The inability of the state surprised all parties. The government was shocked as the Lapua Movement had already been thought to have subsided. According to Governor Bruno Sarlin, 6,000–10,000 soldiers would be needed in Vaasa to contain the crowds. The Governor also believed that he had been threatened by the communists. The left-wing and Swedish-speaking press demanded that the perpetrators be punished. However, the government sided with the Lapua Movement and accused the social democrats and Swedes of tying up their hands in the fight against communism. It was hoped that the movement could still be curbed by concessions and anti-communist legislative initiatives.

However, the Lapuan Movement was emboldened by the riot. In Lapua, the so-called anti-communist Lapua Law of June 5, 1930 was declared. The Lapua Movement abandoned the authorities as the maintainer of order and declared itself above the laws and the judiciary. Vihtori Kosola, the founder of the Lapua Movement, met government representatives on June 8. In Helsinki, both the head of the Defense Forces and the head of the Finnish General Staff, while the board, headed by Kyösti Kallio, hesitated in their decisions. The radicalization Lapuan Movement led to extreme use of violence, political terror, political pressure and influence to attain the goals of the movement.

== See also ==
- Far-right politics in Finland
- Finnish Civil War
- Lapua Movement
- Mäntsälä rebellion
- Onni Happonen
- Political violence in Finland (1918–1932)
- Right-wing terrorism
