= Front Soldier League =

Finnish organization

Front Soldier League (Finnish: Rintamamiesliitto), until 1940 War of Independence Front Soldiers' League (Finnish: Vapaussodan Rintamamiesten Liitto, VRL), was a Finnish Civil War White Guard veteran organization between the years 1929 and 1944, which also had extreme right-wing political objectives. In the early 1930s, it had close links with the Lapua movement, in which the leaders of the League played an important role. The Front Soldier League was abolished in 1944 on the basis of the Moscow peace treaty, which forbade fascist organizations. It had a sister organization for women, the Front Soldier Women's League, which was also disbanded.

According to historians Oula Silvennoinen, Marko Tikka and Aapo Roselius, the leadership of the Front Soldier League consisted mainly of people described as fascists, and the association was Finland's most important background organization for "nationalist radicalism" throughout its existence.

== Establishment and organization ==
The War of Independence Front Soldiers' League was founded in February 1929 in Tampere. It already expanded nationwide in May of the same year, but its original key people were almost all from Tampere. Lieutenant Colonel Onni Purhonen was elected the first President of the League. Other founders were journalist Eero Rekola, merchant KV Huhtala and captain Arvi Kalsta and Iivari Hyppölä, who had become businessmen. The background was also influenced by the manufacturer Rafael Haarla, whose son Eino Haarla later became the chairman of the League.

The VRL was established as a veterans' organisation for the people who fought on the white side in the Finnish Civil War. The founders were motivated by disappointing domestic political developments after the Civil War, and the idea that white veterans should organize themselves into political action to save the legacy of the 1918 victory.

The union had more than 20,000 members. There were about 200 local chapters. The League also had a lot of Swedish-language activities. The League's organs were the Rintamamies (Front Man), published in 1930, and the Frontmannen, in Swedish, published in 1934.

== Contacts with Lapua movement and the right-wing radicalism ==
VRL's political agenda included, above all, opposition to the activities of the left and the labor movement. Its program called, among other things, for the electoral laws to be amended so that the Communists were completely removed from parliament and councils and more weight was given to the votes of the "patriotic people". The union's statutes also mentioned the effort to "protect and revitalize patriotic activity." This meant working closely with the anti-communist Lapua movement and later the Patriotic People's Movement (IKL).

Historian Juha Siltala has described the Front Soldier League as a precursor and "support structure" for the Lapua movement. There were the same people in the leadership of the League as in the delegation of the Lapua movement, and five of the seven members of the League's first board actively participated in the kidnappings of leftists. In Tampere, Helsinki and Turku, the Lapua movement's strike forces were VRL's local leaders and active members. For example, the violent abduction of Väinö Hakkila, Deputy Speaker of Parliament, in July 1930 was led by VLR's chairman Eino Haarla, secretary Eero Rekola and board member Arvi Kalsta. Artturi Vuorimaa, who chaired the Helsinki Front Soldier League, led a local strike force, which abducted MPs Eino Pekkala and Jalmari Rötkö from a meeting of the Parliament's Constitutional Committee. The strike force in the Turku region was led by Eino Laitakari, chairman of the local Front Soldier League.

The relationship between VRL and the Lapua movement became even closer in 1931–1932, when, in Siltala's words, it became the "subdivision" of the Lapua movement. In the 1930s, attempts were made to use the League as a tool in several plans for the coup of far-right activists, none of which progressed to the stage of implementation. In 1931, under the leadership of Aarne Runolinna and Ragnar Gröning, a number of VRL's Helsinki influences founded the Field Grays of the Freedom War, a rival organization that was at least as political and radical. Lieutenant-Colonel Carl Lindh, who was in charge of the field grays, later became VRL's director. The activities of VRL were temporarily banned in 1932 after the Mäntsälä rebellion under the Republican Protection Act, but it was not permanently abolished.

== Subsequent activities and the abolition ==
After the Mäntsälä uprising, the union's open politics diminished and it focused on social work. The Union's most prominent activities were financial assistance, advocacy and traditional activities for white war veterans and the disabled. In addition, it organized War of Independence celebrations and erected war memorials. The organization changed its name to the Front Soldier League in 1940, in order to allow veterans of the Winter War to join. However, the organization that carried the legacy of White Finland did not gain the trust of the majority of veterans, and most of them joined the Finnish League of Comrades-in-Arms, which was established at the same time. From 1940 to 1941, the Front Soldier League was very pro-German, and it recruited volunteers for the Finnish Volunteer Battalion of the Waffen-SS. SS-Comrades-in-Arms, founded in 1943, became a member organization of the Front Soldier League. At the end of the Continuation War, the Front Soldier League visibly opposed Finland's efforts for separate peace.

In 1944, Finland undertook, under Article 21 of the Moscow Armistice Agreement, to disband "all Hitlerite (fascist) political, military and military organizations operating on its territory, as well as other organizations engaged in hostile propaganda to the Allied Nations and especially the Soviet Union." On September 23, 1944, The Field Grays of the Freedom War and the SS-Comrades-in-Arms were among the very first to be abolished, but it was not until a month later that Pavel Orlov, a representative of the Supervisory Commission, forced the Finnish government to take action. The leadership of the Front Soldier League was still offered the opportunity to dissolve the organization itself, but Chairman Lindh and a majority of the federal government refused, so the association was dissolved by a government decision on October 19, 1944. After its dissolution, members of the League served in a pro-Nazi Pro-German resistance movement in Finland.

== Co-Chairs ==
- Lieutenant Colonel Onni Purhonen 1929–?
- Lieutenant Eino Haarla
- Lieutenant Colonel Carl Lindh 1935–1944

== Sources ==
- Alava, Ali: Gestapo Suomessa, Karisto: Hämeenlinna 1974 ISBN 951-23-0844-4.
- Lappalainen, Matti: Hannes Ignatius – Mannerheimin harmaa eminenssi, WSOY: Juva 2005 ISBN 951-0-28656-7.
- Siltala, Juha: Lapuan liike ja kyyditykset 1930. Otava, Helsinki 1985. ISBN 951-1-087-16-9
- Silvennoinen, Oula, Tikka, Marko & Roselius, Aapo: Suomalaiset fasistit – mustan sarastuksen airuet. WSOY, Helsinki 2016. ISBN 978-951-0-40132-3
- Uola, Mikko: Rintamamiesten liitto: Vapaussodan rintamamiesten liitto/Rintamamiesliitto 1929-1944. Rauma: Vapaussoturien huoltosäätiö, 1988. ISBN 9519989390.
- Uola, Mikko: "Suomi sitoutuu hajottamaan…": Järjestöjen lakkauttaminen vuoden 1944 välirauhansopimuksen 21. artiklan perusteella. Suomen Historiallinen Seura, Helsinki 1999. ISBN 951-710-119-8
