= Authoritarian conservatism =

Political ideology

Authoritarian conservatism is a political ideology that seeks to uphold order, tradition, and hierarchy, often with forcible suppression of radical and revolutionary enemies such as communists, Nazis, and anarchists. Authoritarian conservative movements and regimes have included Chiangism in China, Metaxism in Greece, Francoism in Spain, Horthyism in Hungary, and Vichyism in France.

The rise of authoritarian conservatism coincided with the rise of fascism. In some cases, the authoritarian conservatism clashed with fascism, like in Austria and Portugal, while in other cases, like in Francoist Spain, Vichy France, and Fascist Italy, it cooperated with fascism. Although both ideologies espoused nationalism and anti-communism, the traditionalist nature of authoritarian conservatism made it distinct from the revolutionary, palingenetic, and populist nature of fascism. While fascism espoused vitalism, irrationalism, or secular neo-idealism, the authoritarian conservatism based its views on the traditional religion.

Although the concept of authority has been identified as a core tenet of conservatism in general, authoritarian conservatism is only one of many different forms of conservatism. It is contrasted with libertarian conservatism, which was a formerly dominant form of conservatism in the United States.

== Ideology ==
=== Historical roots ===
The two philosophical forefathers of conservatism, Edmund Burke and Joseph de Maistre, inspired two separate forms of conservatism. Whereas the first was rooted in a more libertarian Whig tradition, the latter was ultramontane, ultra-royalist, and ultimately authoritarian.

G. W. F. Hegel has also been identified as one of the most important conservative philosophers. Especially his work Elements of the Philosophy of Right (1821) has exerted a powerful influence over conservative ideology. Hegel inspired right-wing authoritarians such as Rudolf Kjellén in Sweden and Giovanni Gentile in Italy. Classical liberals have been critical of Hegel; Karl Popper identified him as the chief ideologue of the authoritarian Prussian state and considered him one of the main ideological enemies of an open society, and Isaiah Berlin accused him as being one of the architects of modern authoritarianism.

=== Modern exponents ===
German political theorist Carl Schmitt advocated authoritarian conservatism. Referred to as "an acute observer and analyst of the weaknesses of liberal constitutionalism" by the Stanford Encyclopedia of Philosophy, Schmitt was a critic of parliamentary democracy, liberalism, and cosmopolitanism. He developed a political theology around concepts such as sovereignty, claiming that "sovereign is he who decides on the exception" and arguing for a dictatorial presidential power who could step outside the rule of law under a state of exception.

Julius Evola, an Italian esoteric traditionalist, has also been described influential authoritarian conservative philosopher. During the interwar period and World War II, Evola criticized Italian fascism for not enough radicalism and supported Nazi Germany, calling for a synthesis of Nazism and fascism; after World War II, his ideas were presented as non-fascist by his supporters.

=== Relation to fascism ===
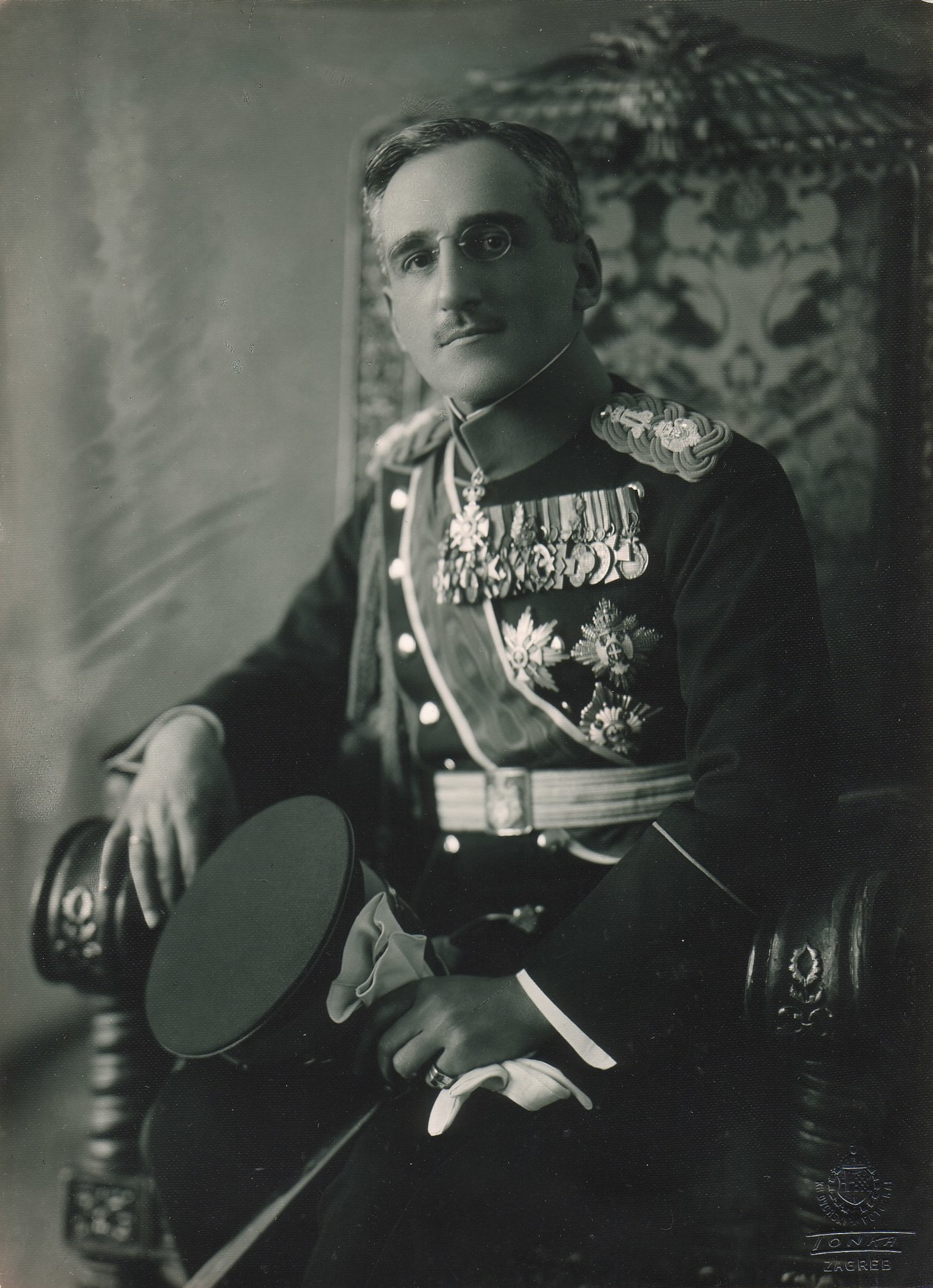
King Alexander I of Yugoslavia (1888–1934) was assassinated by Croatian fascists.

Authoritarian conservatism was prominent in the same era as fascism; in some cases it presented its own movements distinct from fascism with which it sometimes clashed, or in the cases of Francoist Spain, Vichy France, and Fascist Italy it cooperated. The Interwar period and World War II saw examples of cooperation of authoritarian conservatism and fascism, which made the distinction between them blurry. Although both ideologies shared core values such as nationalism and had common enemies such as communism and materialism, there was nonetheless a contrast between the traditionalist nature of authoritarian conservatism and the revolutionary, palingenetic and populist nature of fascism—thus it was common for authoritarian conservative regimes to suppress rising fascist and Nazi movements. The hostility between the two ideologies is highlighted by the struggle for power in Austria, which was marked by the assassination of ultra-Catholic statesman Engelbert Dollfuss by Austrian Nazis. Likewise, Croatian fascists (Ustaše) assassinated King Alexander I of Yugoslavia.

Edmund Fawcett explains the difference between fascism and authoritarian conservatism as follows:

Fascism, to schematize, is a form of totalitarianism. It imposes control on every aspect of the state, society, economy, and cultural life. It works through a single party with an all-embracing ideology commonly under a charismatic leader claiming to speak for the people. Its enemies are pluralism and diversity. Fascism stifles opposition by violence and fear and stabilizes itself by mobilizing popular engagement. Authoritarianism, by contrast, allows independent economic and social bodies, forms of limited representation, and a degree of freedom of religion. Its enemy is democratic participation. It also stifles opposition by violence and fear but stabilizes itself by relying on passive acquiescence in a trade-off of social quiet for loss of political role. The fascist is a nonconservative who takes anti-liberalism to extremes. The right-wing authoritarian is a conservative who takes fear of democracy to extremes.

The authoritarian conservative right is distinguished from fascism in that such conservatives tended to use traditional religion as the basis for their philosophical views, while fascists based their views on vitalism, irrationalism, or secular neo-idealism. Fascists often drew upon religious imagery, but used it as a symbol for the nation and replaced spirituality with ultranationalism and statolatry. Even in the most religious of the fascist movements, the Romanian Iron Guard, "Christ was stripped of genuine otherworldly mystery and was reduced to a metaphor for national redemption."

A term used by some scholars is para-fascism, which refers to authoritarian conservative movements and regimes that adopt some characteristics associated with fascism such as personality cults, paramilitary organizations, symbols and rhetoric without committing to fascist tenets such as palingenetic ultranationalism, modernism, and populism.

== History ==
=== Africa ===
==== Togo ====
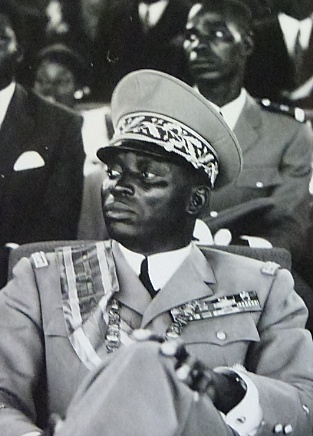
Gnassingbé Eyadéma (1935–2005)

The Rally of the Togolese People (RTP) was the ruling political party in Togo from 1969 to 2012. It was founded by President Gnassingbé Eyadéma and headed by his son, President Faure Gnassingbé, after the former died in 2005. Faure Gnassingbé replaced the RPT with a new ruling party, the national-conservative Union for the Republic, in April 2012, dissolving the RPT.

=== Asia ===
==== Cambodia ====
The Social Republican Party was a political party in Cambodia, founded by the then-head of state Lon Nol on 10 June 1972. Its platform was populist, nationalist, and anti-communist, Lon Nol being determined to oppose North Vietnamese and Chinese influence in the region in the context of the Second Indochina War. The party's primary function, however, was to support and legitimise Lon Nol's leadership of the country; he was later to develop a rather ramshackle chauvinist and semi-mystical ideology called "Neo-Khmerism" to back his political agenda.

==== China ====
Han Fei's Legalism in the 3rd century B.C. advocated authoritarian conservatism that elevated the position of ruler. Legalism argued that administrative discipline, not Confucian virtue, was crucial for the governance of the state.

Modern Chinese conservatism was often accompanied by authoritarianism; the Chinese nationalist party Kuomintang (KMT) originally started out as a social democratic party that advocated Westernization in the Sun Yat-sen period, but Chiang Kai-shek, the leader of the KMT who succeeded Sun, ruled conservative and anti-communist right-wing dictatorship after Shanghai massacre in 1927; After the reform and opening up in 1980s, neoauthoritarianism gained its root in the Chinese Communist Party. Neoauthoritarianism is a conservative political thought that advocates for a powerful centralized state to promote market reforms within the Chinese Communist Party (CCP), a concept that has been described as right-wing and classically conservative, despite including some aspects of Marxist–Leninist and Maoist theories.

One of the top leaders and the gray eminence of the Chinese Commmunist Party, Wang Huning, has criticized the western youth for their supposed rejection of traditional western values in his writing; Wang argues for a culturally unified and traditionalist China, albeit mixed with Marxist-Leninist theories. After Xi Jinping came to power, China has become increasingly culturally conservative, traditionalist and nationalist. Furthermore, Xi Jinping has also accelerated the crackdown on LGBTQ+ activism and pornography production. In 2026, the Cyberspace Administration of China launched a campaign directing Chinese social media platforms to censor content that "promotes not marrying and not having children" or that "provokes gender antagonism."

==== Iran ====
The Iranian Principlists are one of two main political camps inside post-revolutionary Iran, the other being Reformists. The term hardliners that some Western sources use in the Iranian political context usually refers to the faction. Their ideology is clerical, theocratic, and Islamist.

==== South Korea ====
Park Chung Hee was a South Korean politician and army general who seized power in the May 16 coup of 1961 and then was elected as the third President of South Korea in 1963. He introduced the highly authoritarian Yushin Constitution, ushering in the Fourth Republic of Korea. Ruling as a dictator, he constantly repressed political opposition and dissent and wholly controlled the military. He ruled the country until his assassination in 1979.

=== Europe ===
==== Belgium ====
The Rexist Party was a far-right Catholic, corporatist, and royalist political party active in Belgium from 1935 until 1945. In its early period—until around 1937—it tried to win power by democratic means and did not want totally to abolish democratic institutions. During the German occupation of Belgium, it became a fascist movement.

==== Bulgaria ====
Zveno was a Bulgarian political organization founded in 1930 by Bulgarian politicians, intellectuals, and Bulgarian Army officers. It advocated for rationalization of Bulgaria's economic and political institutions under a dictatorship that would be independent from both the Soviet Union and the Axis powers. They strongly opposed the Bulgarian party system, which they saw as dysfunctional, and the terror of the Internal Macedonian Revolutionary Organization. King Boris III, an opponent of Zveno, orchestrated a coup through a monarchist Zveno member, General Pencho Zlatev, who became Prime Minister in January 1935. In April 1935, he was replaced by another monarchist, Andrei Toshev.

==== Finland ====
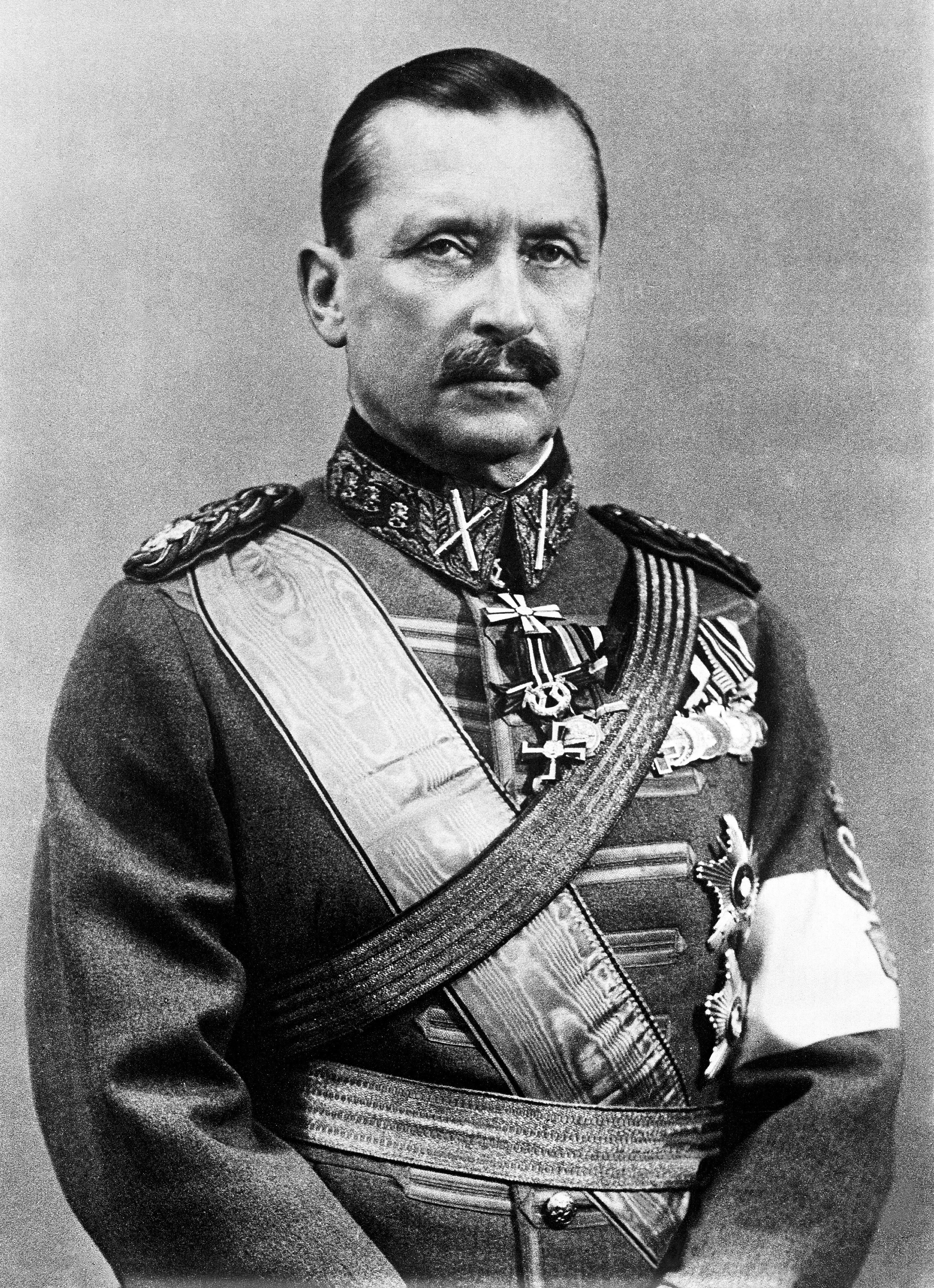
Carl Gustaf Emil Mannerheim (1867–1951)

In the Finnish Civil War, rightist White Finland defeated the leftist Red Finland. The clashes occurred in the context of the turmoil caused by World War I in Europe. The paramilitary White Guards were led by Carl Gustaf Emil Mannerheim and were assisted by the German Imperial Army at the request of the Finnish civil government. The Lapua Movement was a radical Finnish nationalist, pro-German, and anti-communist political movement. Led by Vihtori Kosola, it turned towards far-right politics after its founding and was banned after a failed coup d'état attempt in 1932. The Peasant March was a demonstration in Helsinki attended by more than 12,000 supporters from all over the country to put pressure on the Finnish government to suppress communism in the country.

==== Germany ====
The Conservative Revolution was an influential ideological movement during the Weimar Republic. Although usually characterized with terms such as radical, revolutionary, ultra, and romantic, the movement also had elements of authoritarianism. For example, Arthur Moeller van den Bruck published the influential book Das Dritte Reich (1923) in which he advocated a "Third Reich" that would unite all German classes under an authoritarian rule. Within the Weimar Republic, the German National People's Party (DNVP), Kurt von Schleicher and Franz von Papen have been described as authoritarian conservatives. The sympathizers of the authoritarian conservatism, such as Schleicher, had been promoted to President Paul von Hindenburg's entourage since 1925 and represented an important pressure group.

Authoritarian conservatives believed that the party politics were deficient. Instead, they wanted to replace it with a broad "movement" or front to govern the country without the parliamentary involvement. Schleicher, although a major proponent of authoritarian conservatism, considered a dictatorship without a popular backing problematic, fearing a civil war involving both the Communists and Nazis and a possible Polish intervention. He and other authoritarian conservatives did not believe anymore that the masses would go along with the wise authoritarian order. They did not support the active popular participation and the totalitarian integration, but still accepted the need for society rallying around the leaders based on shared political convictions. Therefore, Schleicher turned to Nazis, but he first made an offer to form a coalition government to various groups, including Strasserists, before approaching Adolf Hitler himself.

The authoritarian conservatives sought to use Nazis and later bring them in line with more conservative goals of the DNVP. However, Hitler managed to capitalize on a personal rivalry between Schleicher and Papen, who both served as the chancellors, with President Hindenburg ultimately appointing Hitler as chancellor after Schleicher faced crisis from the Reichstag in January 1933, with Papen being given a "watching brief" as Vice Chancellor. Schleicher was ultimately killed in 1934 during the Night of the Long Knives, while Papen barely escaped death and was devoted to the position of Ambassador of Germany to Turkey.

==== Greece ====
The 4th of August Regime was an authoritarian, arch-conservative, and royalist regime under the leadership of General Ioannis Metaxas, who ruled over the Kingdom of Greece from 1936 to 1941. Metaxas' ideology is known as Metaxism. The regime took inspiration in its symbolism and rhetoric from Fascist Italy but retained close links to Britain and the French Third Republic, rather than the Axis powers.

==== Portugal ====
António de Oliveira Salazar and his Estado Novo have been described as authoritarian conservative. In 1933, Salazar denounced fascism as "pagan caesarism" which advocates a "new state which knows no juridical or moral limits". On 29 July 1934, Salazar dissolved the Portuguese fascist National Syndicalist movement and the government's note rejected its "exaltation of youth, the cult of force through so-called direct action, the principle of the superiority of state political power in social life, the propensity for organizing masses behind a single leader". Although the Spanish Civil War radicalized the political situation in the Iberian peninsular and led Salazar to create a youth movement and a paramilitary force which used the Fascist salute, its regime never adopted fascism and instead remained authoritarian Catholic corporatist similarly to the Austria of Engelbert Dollfuss.

==== Romania ====
The National Renaissance Front was a Romanian political party created by King Carol II in 1938 as the single monopoly party of government following his decision to ban all other political parties and suspend the 1923 Constitution, and the passing of the 1938 Constitution of Romania. Largely reflecting Carol's own political choices, the FRN was the last of several attempts to counter the popularity of the fascist and antisemitic Iron Guard. As Carol witnessed the failure of European countries to defend themselves from Nazi German advances, consecrated by the Anschluss and the Munich Agreement, he ordered the decapitation of the Iron Guard, whom he perceived as a fifth column for Nazi Germany: during the following days, Corneliu Zelea Codreanu and the majority of top-ranking fascists were assassinated.

==== Ukraine ====
The authoritarian Ukrainian State headed by Cossack aristocrat Pavlo Skoropadskyi represented the conservative movement. The 1918 Hetman government, which appealed to the tradition of the 17th–18th century Cossack Hetman state, represented the conservative strand in Ukraine's struggle for independence. It had the support of the proprietary classes and conservative and moderate political groups.

=== Latin America ===
==== Chile ====
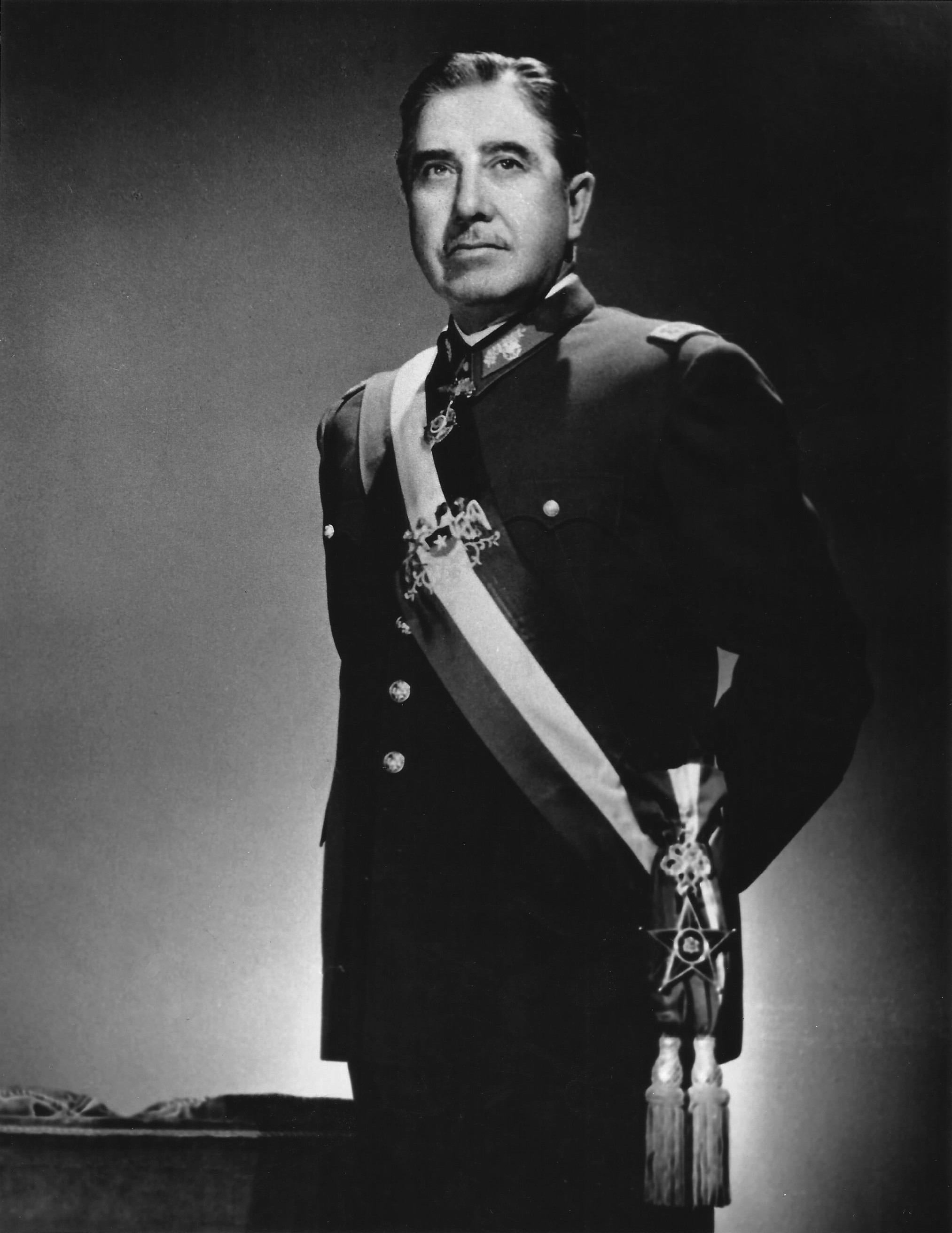
Augusto Pinochet (1915–2006)

During the military dictatorship of Chile, the country was ruled by a military junta headed by General Augusto Pinochet. As an ideology, Pinochetism was anti-communist, militaristic, nationalistic, and laissez-faire capitalistic. Under Pinochet, Chile's economy was placed under the control of a group of Chilean economists known collectively as the Chicago Boys, whose liberalising policies have been described by some as neoliberal.

=== North America ===
==== United States ====
Mainstream conservatism in the United States was always strongly influenced by libertarian ideals. Historian Leo P. Ribuffo notes, "what Americans now call conservatism much of the world calls liberalism or neoliberalism". The topic of authoritarianism is therefore controversial within the American conservative movement. John Dean, a critic of Presidents George W. Bush and Donald Trump, writes in Conservatives without Conscience (2006):

Social conservatism and neoconservatism have revived authoritarian conservatism, and not for the better of conservatism or American democracy. True conservatism is cautious and prudent. Authoritarianism is rash and radical. American democracy has benefited from true conservatism, but authoritarianism offers potentially serious trouble for any democracy.

The second presidency of Donald Trump has been noted for authoritarian practices which some analysts associate with characteristics of authoritarian conservatism, with the administration frequently relying on executive orders, at times bypassing the traditional processes of legislating new laws in the congressional approval process. This has been argued as in alignment with the principles of the unitary executive theory stating the constitution supports a stronger executive branch. While supporters argue that this is a useful utilization of executive power to reduce unnecessary oversight from the legislative branch voting against laws, critics have characterized this approach as reflecting a more centralized or autocratic governance style than past administrations, with it emphasizing an expansion of centralized executive authority to the point of being seen by local courts as unconstitutional.

== See also ==
- Authoritarian nationalism
- Erdoğanism
- Kokkashugi
- Paternalistic conservatism
- Right-wing authoritarianism
- Traditional authority
- Ultraconservatism
