= Artturi Vuorimaa =

Finnish politician

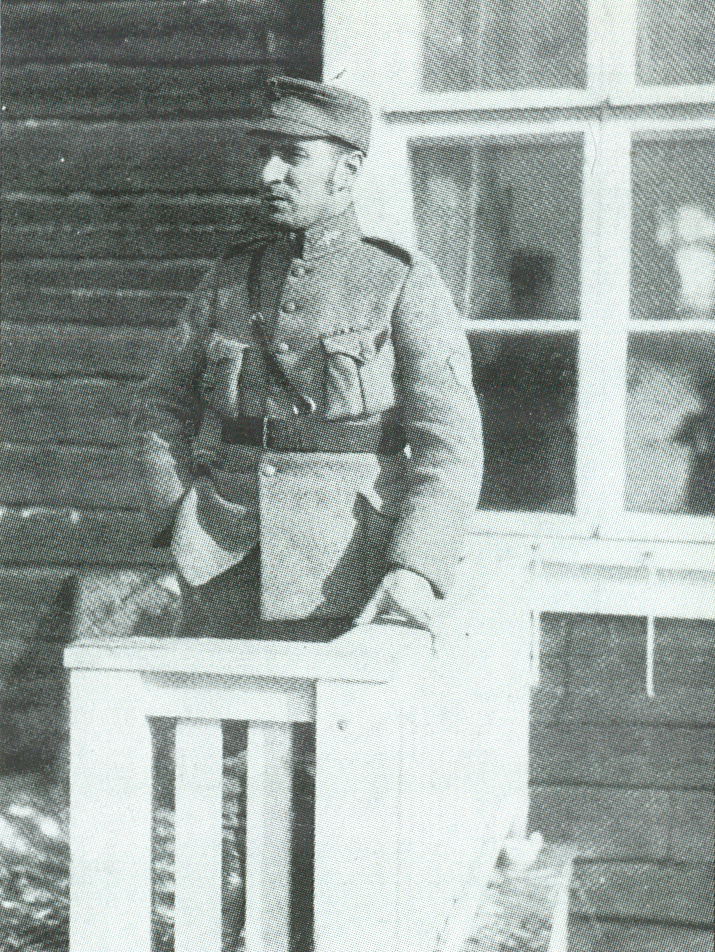
Artturi Vuorimaa in 1932.

Artturi Vilho Vuorimaa (until 1923 Vilhelm Arthur Blomberg, August 8, 1890, Helsinki – October 28, 1972, Helsinki) was a Finnish Lapua movement activist, who played a key role in the Mäntsälä Rebellion in 1932.

== Childhood and family ==
Vuorimaa attended seven classes Oulu Finnish co-educational school. He was married in 1910 to Emmi Maria Järvenpää (b. 1892). The couple had a total of five children, at least two of whom lived to adulthood.

After attending school, Vuorimaa worked in Simo as a businessman and in various positions in the municipality, e.g. as a member of the municipality's first council.

== Military career ==
During the Finnish Civil War, on April 15, 1918, Vuorimaa was promoted to lieutenant. At least in 1926, Vuorimaa served as a lieutenant in the White Guard staff as a controller. He was later promoted to captain.

Vuorimaa was part of the first board of the Front Soldier League established in May 1929.

== Activity in Lapua movement ==
Vuorimaa, who worked as a controlled for Hakkapeliitta magazine, was the "Helsinki strike force" leader in the summer of 1930 and together with Kosti-Paavo Eerolainen organized the kidnapping of socialist workers' and small farmers' parliamentary group MPs Jalmari Rötkö and Eino Pekkala from the House of the Estates parliamentary constitutional law committee session on July 5, 1930. He personally carried the small-sized Rötkö out of the committee room. In October 1930, the leadership of the Lapua movement had to, under pressure from the country's government, hand over to the authorities Vuorimaa and Eerolainen - the most famous kidnappers of the movement. However, the movement's management immediately organized a big solidarity campaign to free them.

When Mäntsälä's rebellion started in February 1932, Vuorimaa was hiding in Sääksjärvi, because he was again wanted for kidnapping members of parliament. Vuorimaa became the spiritual leader of the rebels and drafted 28. February the rebels' declaration to the president of the republic, which demanded the suppression of Marxism and the resignation of the government. After the end of the Mäntsälä rebellion, Vuorimaa was imprisoned with the leaders of the rebellion, and he was sentenced to two and a half years in prison for his activities as an instigator and organizer of the rebellion. However, the sentence was changed to parole.

Vuorimaa participated in the early 1940s in the Finnish National Socialist Labor Organisation (SKT). He shared his lessons especially with SKT's young supporters.

Later, Vuorimaa worked in different positions for the Agrarian Party in northern Finland.

== Sources ==
- Vuorimaan henkilötiedot
- Mäntsälän kapina
- Juha Siltala: Lapuan liike ja kyyditykset 1930. Otava, Helsinki 1985.
- Vuorimaan toiminta Kuulonhuoltoliitossa
