= VRL (disambiguation) =

Victorian Rugby League, now NRL Victoria, is a sports governing body in Victoria, Australia.

VRL may also refer to:

- VRL Group, an Indian conglomerate
- Water Polo Regional League (Vaterpolo regionalna liga), regional water polo league in Southeast Europe
- Front Soldier League, until 1940 War of Independence Front Soldiers' League (Vapaussodan Rintamamiesten Liitto), a Finnish Civil War White Guard veteran organization
- Vila Real Airport, Portugal (IATA:VRL)
