= Onni Happonen =

Finnish politician, murdered in 1930

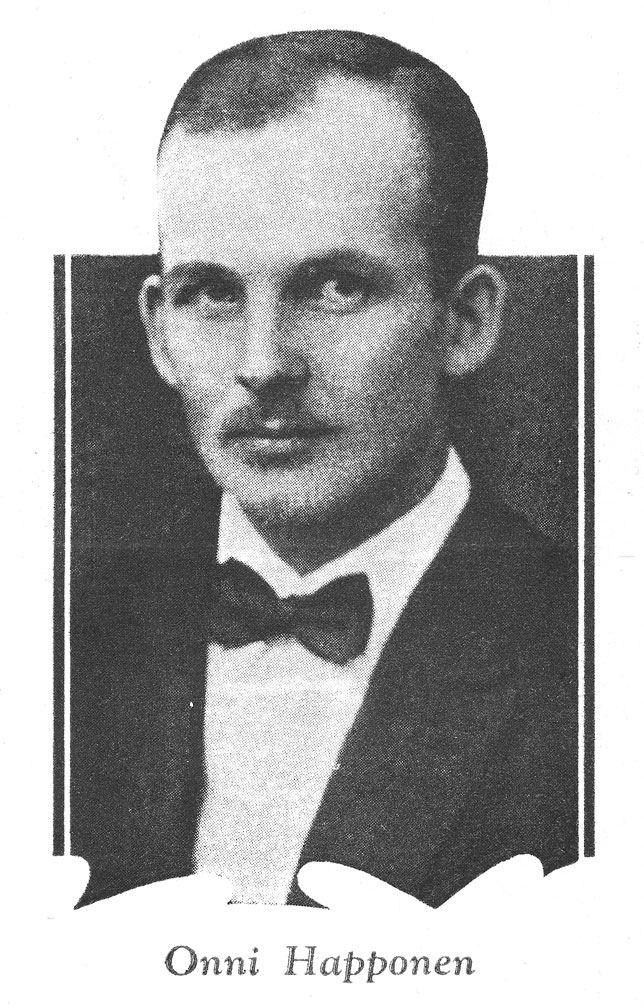
- Born: 21 May 1898; Heinävesi, Grand Duchy of Finland
- Died: 1 September 1930 (aged 32); Heinävesi, Finland
- Occupation: politician

Onni Happonen (21 May 1898 – 1 September 1930) was a Finnish politician representing the Social Democratic Party of Finland. He was kidnapped and murdered by the fascist Lapua Movement.

Happonen was born in Pölläkkä, Heinävesi, South Savo. He was a construction entrepreneur and the chairman of the Heinävesi municipal council. As a politician, Happonen often argued with local landowners who were supporters or members of the Lapua Movement and the paramilitary right-wing White Guard.

Together with the Ståhlberg kidnapping, the Peasant March and the Mäntsälä rebellion, the Happonen murder is one of the major incidents involving the Lapua Movement.

== Death ==
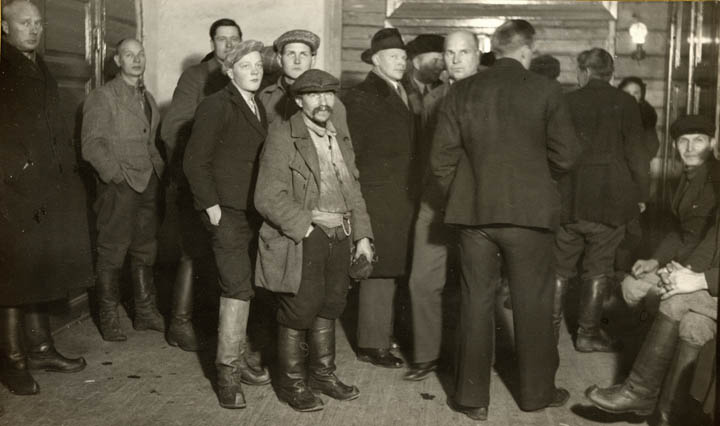
Lapua Movement members in court

Happonen had already been kidnapped and beaten in July 1930. Instead of the police, Happonen contacted the Governor Albin Pulkkinen who ordered his protection. However, on 1 September 1930, a fascist mob rushed the council meeting at the Heinävesi town hall. Happonen fled to the back room where he tried to call a trusted policeman but the lines were cut off. Happonen then escaped through the window firing a warning shot, but the pistol malfunctioned and he was caught by the Lapua fascists.

A local police officer, who belonged to the staff of the Heinävesi White Guard, arrested Happonen for the shooting, but instead of being taken into custody, he was handed over to the fascist mob. Happonen was forced into a car and driven towards Joensuu. The fascists stopped near the Karvio Canal where they took Happonen out of the car and murdered him.

Happonen's body was not discovered until July 1932 when it was found buried in an anthill on the side of the Varkaus–Joensuu-highway, 45 kilometres from Heinävesi. According to the autopsy report, Happonen was severely beaten and killed by a gunshot to the neck.

== Murder trial ==
Once Happonen's body was found, two local men, Otto Pakarinen and Anselmi Puustinen, confessed to having carried out the murder. In November 1933, they were sentenced to nine years and six years, respectively, in prison. Seven Lapua Movement members from Kuopio were given sentences of between three and six months for having been involved in the kidnapping, but the local fascists were not convicted.

After hearing their sentences, Pakarinen and Puustinen announced that their testimony had been false, and that they had been given bribes to plead guilty to the murder. They now insisted that they themselves had done no more than help to conceal Happonen's body, and that they did not know who the actual murderers were. Finally, the Supreme Court dropped the charges against Puustinen; on the other hand, the court upheld the conviction of Pakarinen. To this day, the real assassins of Happonen remain unknown.

== See also ==
- List of kidnappings
- Lists of solved missing person cases
- List of unsolved murders (1900–1979)
