= Jussi Muilu =

Finnish farmer (1901–1976)

Johannes (Jussi) Muilu (born 27 June 1901 in Lapua, Finland - died 24 October 1976 in Lapua, Finland) was a farmer from Southern Ostrobothnia, Finland who was active in the Lapua Movement in the early 1930s.

Jussi Muilu was born to parents Juho Muilu and Liisa Malkamäki. He was interested in machinery and owned a Ford Model T already in the 1920s and also worked as a chauffeur with a bus. In the Lapua Movement, he quickly became known for his active participation in kidnapping, which even led to the Finnish word "muiluttaa" (literally "to Muilu", meaning "to kidnap") being invented in his name.

Muilu himself said that the word had been invented by Martti Pihkala, who invented it after seeing the sturdily built Muilu walking along a plank to a cattle transport wagon during the Peasant March. Martti Pihkala said about this:

Kävellessäni Lapuan kirkonkylän keskusraitille siinä kesä- tai heinäkuussa 1930, huomasin meijerin kohdalla suuren mustan aivan uuden henkilöauton vieressä seisomassa kookkaan, komean körttimiehen Jussi Muilun. Pysähdyin juttelemaan, olimmehan olleet monia lakkoja yhdessä murtamassa. Kysäisin, että ajatteko tätä autoa? Ajanhan minä. Kenen auto tämä on? Onhan vaan. Vain niin, olette tainneet tällä kyyditä? Kuinkahan lie? Taidatte olla oikein aikamoinen kyyditsijä, oikein aikamoinen muiluttaja...

Translation:

As I was walking to the central road of Lapua in June or July 1930, I noticed the large and handsome man Jussi Muilu standing next to a brand new large black automobile. I stopped to chat with him, as we had been breaching many strikes together. I asked him if he was driving this car. Yes I am, he replied. Whose car might this be? It is, it is. Oh, you might have been kidnapping people with this car? How is it? You certainly are quite a kidnapper, quite a muilu'er even...
