= Artturi Leinonen =

Finnish politician

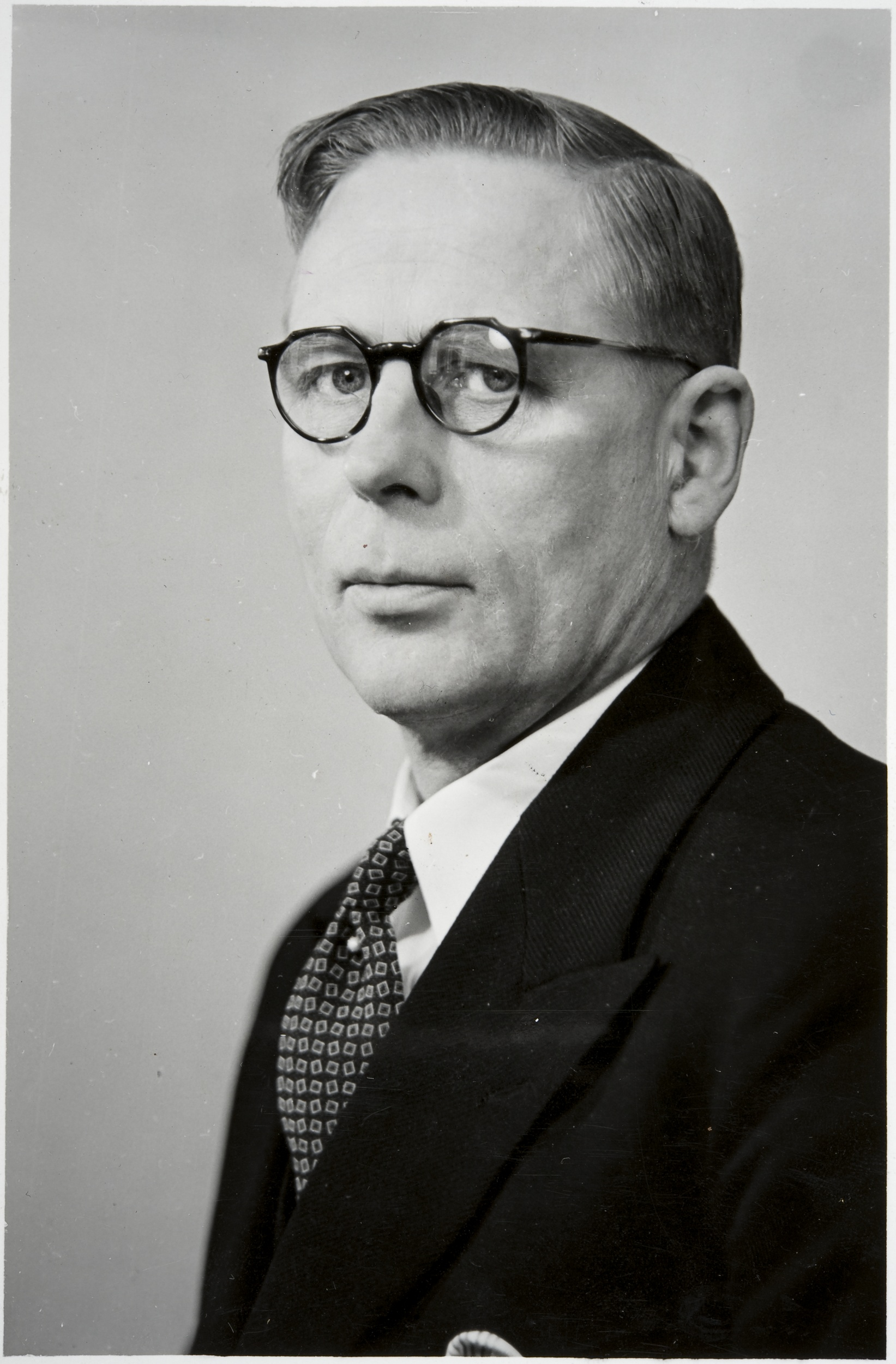
Artturi Leinonen in the early 1940s

Artturi Aleksanteri Leinonen (15 December 1888, Ylihärmä – 26 February 1963) was a Finnish schoolteacher, journalist, writer and politician. He was a Member of the Parliament of Finland from 1936 to 1939 and again from 1944 to 1945, representing the Agrarian League. Leinonen was an enthusiastic supporter of the Lapua Movement, but opposed the organization after it took a more radical turn. He helped prevent the Mäntsälä rebellion from escalating out of control.

In 1935, Leinonen was sentenced to one month in prison under the Sedition Act for insulting Paavo Virkkunen. Leinonen served his sentence in Vaasa County Prison.
