= Fascist and anti-Fascist violence in Italy (1919–1926) =

Civil unrest in Italy (1919–1926) Rivoluzione fascista
- Part of the Revolutions of 1917–23
- Benito Mussolini and fascists during the March on Rome in 1922
Date	15 April 1919 – 31 October 1926 (7 years, 6 months, 2 weeks and 2 days)
Location	Kingdom of Italy
Result	Ascension of Benito Mussolini as Prime Minister of Italy in 1922 after the March on Rome and fascist takeover of the Italian government in 1924 following the assassination of Giacomo Matteotti. Eventual repression of anti-fascists and arrest of anti-fascist leaders.

Belligerents
Far-left and anti-fascists	Government	Fascists

Commanders and leaders
Amadeo Bordiga (communist); Antonio Gramsci (communist); Errico Malatesta (anarcho-communist); Guido Picelli (Arditi del Popolo, an anti-fascist coalition)	1919–1922 (Kingdom of Italy) Victor Emmanuel III (Kingdom of Italy) Giovanni Giolitti (Kingdom of Italy) Ivanoe Bonomi (Kingdom of Italy) Luigi Facta 1922–1926 (Kingdom of Italy) Victor Emmanuel III (Kingdom of Italy) Benito Mussolini	Benito Mussolini (allied with the government after 1922)

The Kingdom of Italy witnessed significant widespread civil unrest and political strife in the aftermath of World War I and the rise of Italian fascism, the far-right movement led by Benito Mussolini, which opposed the rise at the international level of the political left, especially the far-left along with others who opposed fascism. This period of unrest was labelled by the Fascists and later by some historians rivoluzione fascista ("Fascist Revolution"), although the term did not become commonly accepted by Italian historiography.

== History ==
Fascists and leftists fought on the streets during this period as the two factions competed to gain power in Italy. The already tense political environment in Italy escalated into major civil unrest when fascists began attacking their rivals, beginning on 15 April 1919 with fascists attacking the offices of the Italian Socialist Party's newspaper Avanti!

Violence grew in 1921 with Royal Italian Army officers beginning to assist the fascists with their violence against communists and socialists. With the fascist movement growing, anti-fascist of various political allegiances but generally of the international left combined into the Arditi del Popolo (People's Militia) in 1921. In 1922, with the threat of a general strike being initiated by anarchists, communists, and socialists, the fascists launched a coup against the second Facta government with the March on Rome, which pressured Prime Minister Luigi Facta to resign and allowed Mussolini to be appointed prime minister of Italy by King Victor Emmanuel III. Two months after Mussolini took over as prime minister, fascists attacked and killed members of the local labour movement in Turin in what became known as the 1922 Turin massacre.

The next act of violence was the assassination of socialist deputy Giacomo Matteotti by the fascist militant Amerigo Dumini in 1924. Armando Casalini, a National Fascist Party deputy, was killed on a tramway in retaliation for Matteotti's murder by the anti-fascist Giovanni Corvi. This was followed by a fascist takeover of the Italian government and multiple assassination attempts were made against Mussolini in 1926, with the last attempt on 31 October 1926. On 9 November 1926, the fascist government initiated emergency powers, which resulted in the arrest of multiple anti-fascists including communist Antonio Gramsci. Afterwards, serious opposition to Fascist Italy collapsed.

== "Fascist Revolution" ==
This period of unrest was labelled by Fascist intellectuals and later by the Italian historian Renzo De Felice "the Fascist Revolution" (rivoluzione fascista), although the term did not become commonly accepted by Italian historiography. Gaetano Arfé argued against Felice's term in 1975: "With this we also get closer to the answer to whether fascism was or was not a revolution. In my opinion, it was not a direct revolution, and it is no coincidence that historiography has not accepted the term fascist revolution, there is no one who speaks of fascist revolution." Other historians stated that it was a revolution in a way the term "revolution" was understood prior to the French Revolution, since this period saw rapid political changes, but did not change the fundamental structures of society.

The term became supported by Emilio Gentile, Zeev Sternhell and George L. Mosse, who argued that "the Fascist Revolution" was a "totalitarian" revolution from the right. According to Sternhell "the fascist revolution sought to change the nature of the relationships between the individual and the collectivity without destroying the impetus of economic activity - the profit motive, or its foundation - private property, or its necessary framework - the market economy. This was one aspect of the novelty of fascism; the fascist revolution was supported by an economy determined by the laws of the market."

These historians are criticized by Enzo Traverso:

No fascist movement came to power without being supported, in a more or less explicit way, by the traditional elites. [...] It is important to take these precautions into account whenever we speak of fascist revolution', unless we are to risk being blinded by the language and aesthetics of fascism itself. Swiss historian Philippe Burrin has persuasively argued that the 'fascist revolution' historically appears as a revolution without revolutionaries.' Because of the emphasis they placed upon the revolutionary matrix of fascism, Mosse, Sternhell, and Gentile tend to ignore the presence of a conservative component within fascism. They insist upon its modern dimension, on its will to build a 'new civilization', and its totalitarian character. At the same time, however, they forget that conservatism comes with modernity. In fact, conservatism constitutes one of its faces. As Isaiah Berlin suggested in an essay on Joseph de Maistre, the classical ideology of counterrevolution itself prefigured some of the features of fascism.

== Leaders of the factions ==
- Anarchist: Errico Malatesta was a major leader of anarchists in Italy during this period.
- Communist: Amadeo Bordiga and Gramsci were leaders of the Communist Party of Italy, whose members engaged in civil violence against fascists.
- Fascist: Mussolini led the fascists who opposed and engaged in violence with international leftists who were gaining prominence in the late 1910s and early 1920s.
- Arditi del Popolo: Guido Picelli was the deputy of a coalition formed in 1921 between various anti-fascist groups including Malatesta's anarchists and Gramsci's communists, among others, such as socialists, futurists, republicans, and syndicalists.

== See also ==
- Political violence in Finland (1918–1932)
- Political violence in Germany (1918–1933)
