= The Kidnapping of a President =

2026 Finnish film

- Film poster.
- Directed by: Samuli Valkama
- Written by: Samuli Valkama; John Lundsten
- Produced by: Melli Maikkula; John Lundsten
- Starring: Pertti Sveholm; Riitta Havukainen; Jussi Vatanen; Aku Sipola; Elias Salonen
- Cinematography: Tuomo Hutri
- Edited by: Tambet Tasuja
- Music by: Juho Nurmela
- Production company: TACK Films
- Distributed by: Nordisk Film
- Release dates: January 2026 (IFFR); 4 September 2026 (Finland)
- Running time: 87 min
- Countries: Finland; Czech Republic; Netherlands; Estonia
- Language: Finnish
- Budget: €2.8 million

The Kidnapping of a President (Finnish: Presidentin kyyditys) is a 2026 Finnish comedy-drama film directed by Samuli Valkama. The film is about the 1930 kidnapping of Finnish president Ståhlberg. In the film, K. J. Ståhlberg and his wife Ester are played by Pertti Sveholm and Riitta Havukainen.

According to the Finnish Film Foundation, the film's budget is approximately €2.5 million; according to the Estonian Film Institute, over €2.7 million. The Finnish Film Foundation's support amounts to €850,000, while the Estonian Film Institute provided approximately €90,000. In addition, production support granted by the Nordic Film & TV Fund totals 1.4 million Norwegian kroner, approximately €118,000.

Though the film takes place in Finland, it was filmed in the Czech Republic. For example, scenes taking place in Helsinki were filmed in Terezín. This was due to the Czech production incentive scheme, which supported the film's production with 9,567,839 Czech koruna, approximately €388,000.

The Kidnapping of a President premiered at the 2026 International Film Festival Rotterdam. It had its theatrical première in Finland on 4 September 2026.
