= White Guard Affair =

The White Guard Affair (Finnish: Suojeluskuntaselkkaus) was a 1921 conflict between the government of Finland and the leadership of the White Guard (Finnish: suojeluskunnat). It followed from an article written by Paul von Gerich, which caused outrage in various European nations, and the Finnish government to order that he be fired from his position as the chief of the Helsinki White Guard District. The conflict resulted in a reorganization of the White Guard leadership and the suicide of General Major Karl Emil Berg. Von Gerich was later implicated in the February 1922 murder of then Minister of the Interior Heikki Ritavuori, who was involved in selecting the new White Guard leadership and had voiced concerns that elements in the White Guard had been planning a rebellion, although no evidence was found for this implication.

== Background ==
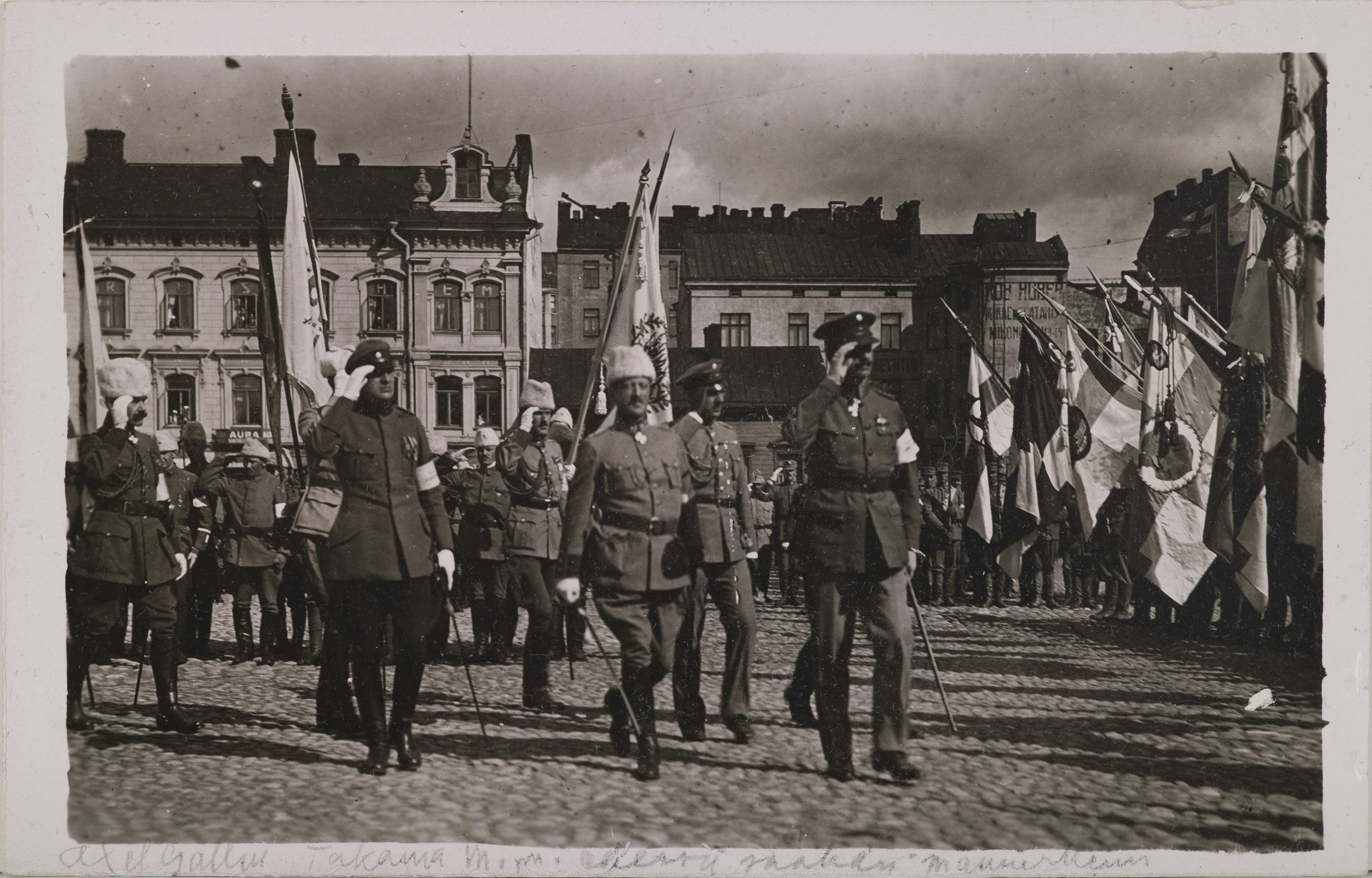
Carl Gustaf Emil Mannerheim leads a White Guard parade in Helsinki in 1919.

Finland declared independence from Russia on 6 December 1917. By the end of January 1918, the country had descended into a civil war, which soon turned violent. By May of 1918, the anti-communist Whites had won the civil war. While the White Army had received help from the approximately 1900 volunteers of the Jäger Movement who had secretly gone to Germany in 1916 to receive military training, Swedish volunteers and Imperial German regulars, the "backbone" of the White Army had consisted of the White Civil Guard.

Even after the civil war had ended in Finland proper, the conflict continued in bordering Russian territories in the form of the Heimosodat, where more than 10,000 Finnish White volunteers conducted multiple "irridentist" and "semi-official military campaigns" starting from 1918. According to Aapo Roselius, these events stemmed in part from the failure of the Whites to properly demobilize, which had resulted in the re-establishment of the Civil Guard only half a year after the end of the Civil War as a movement which "saw itself as the successor to the White Army and as guardian of the White victory of 1918". The White Guard was given an official status in 1919, after which the president of the republic was the commander-in-chief of the White Guard.

The movement soon established itself as a main contributor of the various irridentist campaigns, transforming from a temporary and "hastily organized" organization into one consisting of over 100,000 guardsmen with units in almost every Finnish municipality. This new White Guard outnumbered the totality of the civil war time White Army. Supporters of the re-established movement included the Regent of Finland Carl Gustaf Emil Mannerheim, who had led the White Army during the civil war. According to historians Pekka Hallberg and Tuomo Martikainen, the White Guards soon became "a bourgeois armed force that threatened the democratic system" and "hindered the exercise of power by the parliament and the government."

== The affair ==
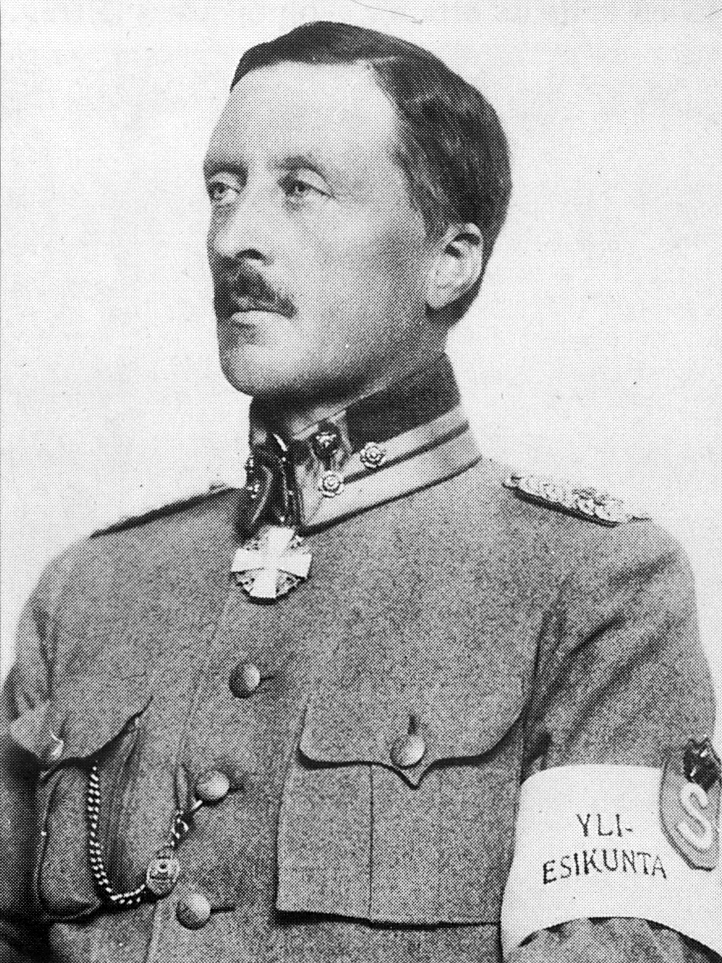
Georg Didrik von Essen, commander of the White Guard at the start of the affair.

On 9 June 1921, the newspaper Hufvudstadsbladet published an article entitled "Will Finland join a Baltic defensive union?" (Finnish: Tuleeko Suomi liittymään baltialaiseen puolustusliittoon?) authored under the nom de plume "v. G." The article criticized the Finnish foreign political alignment with other nations bordering the Soviet Union, and caused a diplomatic incident where ambassadors from France, Italy, Latvia, Poland and Romania expressed their outrage. In reality, the author of the article was the commander of the Helsinki White Guard District, General Paul von Gerich, who had been transferred to the post earlier that year.

After the identity of the author had surfaced, the Finnish government ordered the commander of the White Guard, Georg Didrik von Essen to fire von Gerich. The situation deteriorated when von Essen refused to obey the order. Soon, multiple newspapers began to write about the situation, criticizing the government of interfering in matters internal to the White Guard. To enforce its will, the government replaced von Essen with the army chief-of-staff General Major Karl Emil Berg. After Berg entered office, von Gerich resigned before he could be fired. Berg's actions led to severe criticism from his fellow officers, including his expulsion from the Club of the Finnish Cadets. Two days after taking command, Berg shot himself.

After the assembly of the Civil Guard refused to acknowledge that von Essen had been fired, discussions were held between the assembly and the Finnish government regarding a solution wherein von Essen's firing would be rescinded, and the assembly would instead fire von Gerich. This solution, however, remained unfeasible due to lack of trust in von Essen from the side of the government. As the crisis continued, various White Guard units began to exhibit a "rebellious spirit", and the organization at large began preparations for separating itself from the state.

The situation was resolved only later that year, when Lieutenant Colonel Lauri Malmberg was given overall command of the White Guard, and the White Guards were given greater independence. The appointment of Malmberg, too, was controversial, as elements of the White Guard had been proponents of appointing Mannerheim as the commander. The White Guard was also made directly subordinate to the president of Finland, rather than to the minister of war.

== Later developments ==
Von Gerich was later implicated in the 14 February 1922 murder of the Finnish politician Heikki Ritavuori by Ernst Tandefelt, who had shot Ritavuori. Ritavuori had been vocal about his concerns that left-wing activists, who he believed held great sway in the White Guard, were planning a rebellion. Ritavuori had also been instrumental in appointing Malmberg, rather than the radical-favoured Mannerheim, as the commander of the White Guard. According to historian Lars Westerlund, the conspirators' plan had been to assassinate President Kaarlo Juho Ståhlberg with the intent of installing Pehr Evind Svinhufvud as a new president and Mannerheim as the commander, but that the target had been changed on von Gerich's initiative. Westerlund claims that the planning of the assassination was attended by approximately 10 people, and that some 20 White Guardsmen had participated in the collection of a prize of some 25,000 Finnish marks for Tandefelt. Tandefelt was the only person to be convicted of the assassination.
