= Asser Salo =

Finnish lawyer and politician (1902–1938)

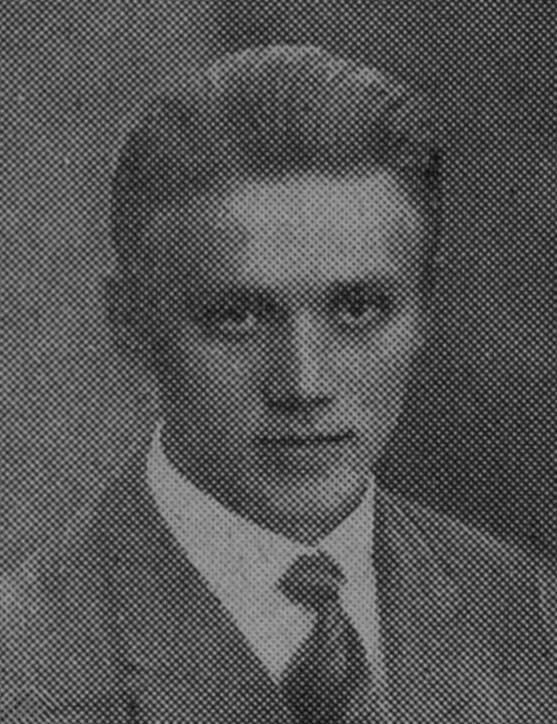
- Born: Edvard Asser Salo; 22 February 1902; Laukaa, Grand Duchy of Finland
- Died: 11 February 1938 (age 35); Karelian ASSR, Soviet Union
- Occupations: Politician, lawyer

Edvard Asser Salo (Russian: Ассер Эдуардович Сало, romanized: Asser Eduardovich Salo; 22 February 1902 – 11 February 1938) was a Finnish lawyer and politician. Born in Laukaa, he was a member of the Parliament of Finland from 1929 to 1930, representing the Socialist Electoral Organisation of Workers and Smallholders (STPV).

== Life ==
On 4 June 1930, he was kidnapped in Vaasa by activists of the anti-communist Lapua Movement, who forced him to threaten his life to make a public promise to never again engage in communist activities on the territory of Vaasa Province. Soon after that he went into exile, first to Sweden, then to the Soviet Union, where he worked at first as a lecturer at the International Lenin School in Moscow. He worked in administrative functions in Leningrad from 1935 to 1936 and in the Karelian ASSR from 1936 until 18 August 1937, when he was dismissed.

As one of the victims of the Great Purge, he was arrested by the NKVD, sentenced to death and shot in the Karelian ASSR on 11 February 1938.

== See also ==
- List of kidnappings

== Works ==
- Class revenge and judicial murder: Toivo Antikainen before fascist justice. Book, Petrozavodsk 1935

== Translations ==
- Friedrich Engels: The Origins of Family, Private Property and the State: In Related Studies of Lewis H. Morgan. Ladislaus from the German edition edited by Rudas was translated into Finnish by Asser Salo. *Book, Petrozavodsk 1935. (Original work Der Ursprung der Familie, des Privateigentums und des Staates.)

== Sources ==
- Asser Salo Members of Parliament of Finland. Parliament.
- List of names of Finns and Karelians executed in 1937–38. (Archived – Internet Archive) Carelia 8/1998.
