= Peasant March =

Politic demonstration in Helsinki in 1930

- Part of Political violence in Finland (1918–1932) and the Lapua Movement
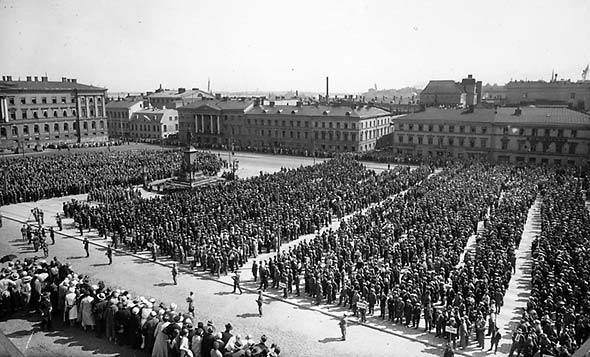
- Participants assembled on the Senate Square in Helsinki
- Date: July 7, 1930
- Location: Helsinki, Finland
- Result: Communist Party of Finland permanently banned until 1944; Ban on all communist activities; Eino Pekkala and Jalmari Rötkö kidnapped; 23 MPs imprisoned on suspicion of "treason"

Parties
Finland
- Finnish Defence Forces
- Parliament of Finland
- Kyösti Kallio
Far-right
- Lapua Movement
- Blue-and-Blacks
- Vihtori Kosola
- Lauri Kristian Relander
- Pehr Evind Svinhufvud
- Carl Gustaf Emil Mannerheim
Far-left
- Communist Party of Finland
- Social Democratic Party of Finland
- Young Communist League of Finland
- Eino Pekkala
- Jalmari Rötkö

The Peasant March (Finnish: talonpoikaismarssi, Swedish: bondetåget) was a demonstration in Helsinki on 7 July 1930 by the far-right Lapua movement, attended by more than 12,000 supporters from all over the country. It was the most significant show of strength in the short history of the Lapua movement, aimed primarily at the Communists, but it was also intended to put pressure on the Finnish government. President Lauri Relander, Prime Minister Pehr Evind Svinhufvud, among others, were invited guests at the main event held at the Senate Square. Also present were right-wing MPs, the country's military leadership, and General Mannerheim, commander-in-chief of the Civil War White Army. The peasant march was intentionally reminiscent of the White Victory Parade of 16 May 1918, and also followed its route.

The original purpose of the Peasant March was to cause the fall of the cabinet of Kyösti Kallio, who pursued a policy of reconciliation with former Reds. When the main goal was realized a few days before the march, the demonstration focused on opposing communism. In his speech to the Finnish parliament, Vihtori Kosola, the leader of the Lapua movement, presented his demands for legislation banning the activities of the Communists. Other keynote speakers were the priests Kaarlo Kares and Väinö Malmivaara, who gave religious speeches and demanded, among other things, an end to blasphemy. In addition to the opposition from the left, the incident sparked opposition from the moderate right as they feared a coup attempt from Lapua.

The Kallio government was powerless in the face of pressure from the Lapua movement when, unsure of the loyalty of the white guard, it was unable to take retaliatory action. On July 1, Parliament convened in the middle of the summer holidays to discuss the Protection Act and five different Communist Acts. On the same day, a delegation from the Lapua movement arrived to meet with President Relander, demanding not only a ban on communist activities but also a move to majority voting, one-man constituencies and the right to vote tied to the ability to pay taxes. A day later, Relander dissolved the cabinet despite a motion of confidence by Parliament. The cartridge depots of the Lapua cartridge factory and Ilmajoki armory were transferred to southern Finland by Minister of Defense Juho Niukkanen before his resignation in the case of a coup. Svinhufvud was appointed the new prime minister on 4 July. Exceptionally, he did not involve parliamentary groups in the cabinet negotiations, but allowed the leadership of the Lapua movement to influence its program and composition.

The next day, the activists of the Lapua movement forced their way into a meeting of the Constitutional Committee, from where they abducted socialist MPs Eino Pekkala and Jalmari Rötkö. On July 6, Interior Minister Erkki Kuokkanen ordered all 23 Communist MPs to be imprisoned on suspicion of "treason". The government also demanded that Pekkala and Rötkö be handed over to the authorities, or else it would not participate in the celebrations of the Peasant March. Background influencers of the Lapua movement Kai Donner and S. J. Pentti urged to keep the socialist MPs in Lapua, but eventually Vihtori Kosola agreed to the demand, fearing the march would be ruined by the absence of the government.

== Participants ==
The number of participants in the march was originally planned to be 40,000, but for security reasons it was decided to limit it to 10,000 men. When there were still significantly more registered, the march was restricted to those over 24 years of age. It also sought to ensure that the event remained calm, with only older men accustomed to military discipline. For the younger ones, white guard celebrations were held across the country for the same weekend. The final number of participants was about 12,600. The march was organized according to white guard districts into 21 battalions with a total of 75 companies. They were further divided into teams and groups of eight men. Many of the participants were armed. Leader of the Southwest Finland regiment Paavo Susitaival also organised a couple of trucks containing machine guns in preparation for a coup. According to him some of the officers planned to go to the parliament and execute the leftist MPs. Susitaival himself was prepared to take over the Presidential Palace and arrest the members of cabinet.

== Foreign reaction ==
The event also attracted attention abroad, as the Peasant March and the anticipated coup were written about as far as Japan. In Sweden, some right-wing newspapers openly supported the march. For example, the Stockholms Dagblad praised the event on its front page. However, in various parts of Europe, Finland was generally described as a fascist sham democracy due to the activities of the Lapua movement. In fascist Italy, Il Popolo d'Italia covered the march positively, applauding its participants. The Economist in England wrote with concern, hoping that "the civilized Nordic element triumphs and not the bloodthirsty Turanid".

== See also ==
- March on Rome
