= Lapua Movement =

Far-right political movement in Finland (1929–32)

- Leaders: Vihtori Kosola, Iivari Koivisto, Vihtori Herttua
- Dates active: 1929–1932
- Ideology: Fascism: Greater Finland; Finnish nationalism; Anti-communism; Authoritarian conservatism
- Political position: Far-right
- Status: Outlawed in 1932
- Size: 30,000-40,000 (association); 100,000 est. (in whole)

The Lapua Movement (Finnish: Lapuanliike or Lapuan liike, Swedish: Lapporörelsen) was a radical Finnish nationalist, fascist, pro-Nazi and anti-communist political movement founded in and named after the town of Lapua. Led by Vihtori Kosola, it turned towards far-right politics after its founding and was banned after a failed coup d'etat attempt in 1932. The movement's anti-communist activities continued in the parliamentarian Patriotic People's Movement.

== Background ==
At the 6th World Congress of the Communist International Joseph Stalin ordered all communist parties around the world to accelerate class struggle. The order led to a higher level of communist activity in Finland in 1929 like the so-called "Red Day" of August 1st when communists organized countrywide protests. A general strike was also declared in November, although it failed to garner support and only 5–10% of workers participated in it.

The movement originated in November 1929, after Finnish communist youth paraded in the conservative and religious town of Lapua enraged pro-White Guard locals, who subsequently attacked the performers physically. The momentum from this event was the catalyst for the formation of the Lapua Movement. It was initially dominated by anti-communist nationalists, emphasizing the legacy of the nationalist activism, the White Guards and the Civil War in Finland. The movement saw itself as the defender of what was won in the Civil War, supporting Lutheranism, Finnish nationalism, and anti-communism.

Many politicians and high-ranking military officers were initially sympathetic to the Lapua Movement, as anti-communism was the norm in the educated classes after the Civil War. However, excessive use of violence made the movement less popular within a few months.

During the Civil War, Ostrobothnia had been one of the most important strongholds of the White army, and anti-communist sentiments remained extremely strong. Late in November 1929, the Young Communist League of Finland arranged meetings and protests in Ostrobothnian Lapua. As the nationalists saw it, the communists had "mocked God, the Lutheran Church, the 'bourgeois' fatherland, the Finnish army and General Mannerheim". This infuriated many of the townspeople, who put a violent end to the meetings. Anti-communist violence was hailed as justified and praiseworthy. On 1 December an anti-communist meeting was held, attracting more than 1,000 people demanding an end to all communist activities. The movement quickly spread around the country, and in some provinces people other than communists were targeted as well, for example the group "Patriotic Citizens of Viitasaari" wanted to purge Jews and Freemasons from the country.

== Activities ==
Between God and Satan, white and red, no middle road exists. The hour of our destiny has arrived, we must align ourselves with one or the other. Two spirits are fighting today for world supremacy, one of them destructive, the other constructive. The [former's] aim is to enable someone—a Dictator-Jew or some small faction?—standing on the ruins of burnt-down homes and bloodstained churches, to exert tyrannical power at will in the name of the ‘proletariat’ while in fact solely pursuing his own interests. The second spirit, by contrast, endeavors to preserve those values already created, and to build a new Finland based on godliness and the rule of law…There are only two kinds of people: the righteous and the godless. The divine world order and the teachings of the Christian Church know of no third possibility.

— The movement’s newspaper, Lapuan Päiväkäsky (The Lapua Daily Order)

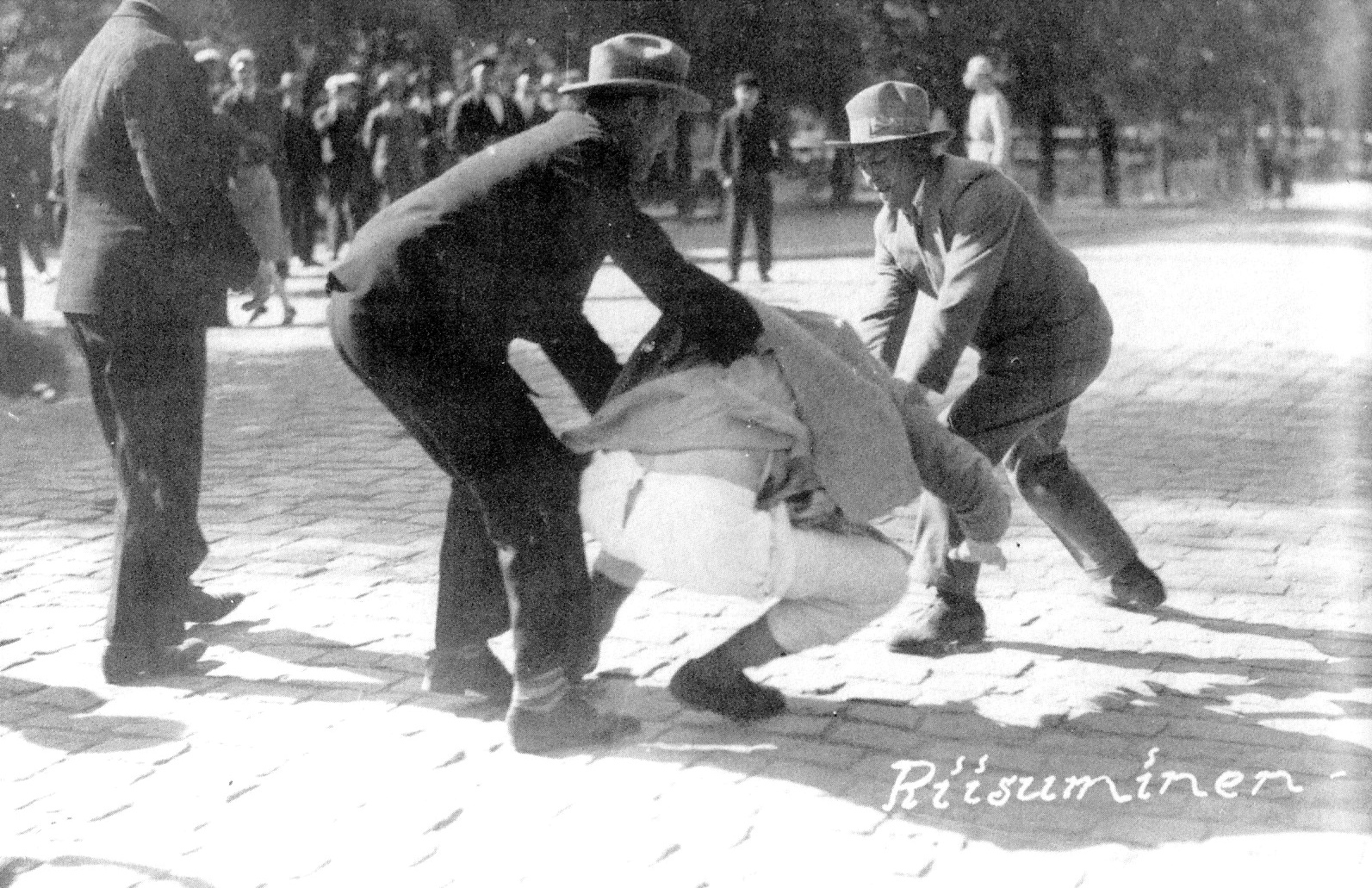
Lapua Movement supporters beating the "red officer" Eino Nieminen in front of the Vaasa courthouse during the 4 June 1930 riot.

After the events in Lapua, local politicians Kustaa Tiitu and Artturi Leinonen called a "national assembly" to the town to discuss the growing communist agitation. The assembly was attended by some two thousand people from across the country, and it drew up a list of demands, which was delivered to the government. The demands were to remove communists from Parliament and the military, to forbid speech that "desecrated the foundations of the Finnish people's sense of morality and justice" and to stop the Communist Party, which had already been banned, from operating in Finland. Other assemblies were quickly organized in different parts of the country, and they all sent similar demands with some also adding that they were prepared to save the country "by other means", as well, should the government fail to act.

The parliament quickly accepted amendments to the Associations Act, but amendments to the Freedom of the Press Act failed to gather sufficient support. Radicals among the Movement answered by attacking the communist paper Työn Ääni directly. The night of March 28th 1930 thirteen men broke into the paper's facilities and destroyed their presses. On April 4th seventy-two men publicly declared themselves responsible for the attack, but only the actual perpetrators and the main organizer, Yrjö Nikula, were charged. The trial, which was held in Vaasa two months later, turned into a riot. After the judge called an intermission and people were leaving the courtroom, Työn Ääni employee and witness in the case, Eino Nieminen, was surrounded by supporters of the Movement, who accused him of being a "red officer". Nieminen was dragged to the street and beaten badly along with three other communists. Asser Salo, Työn Ääni attorney, was abducted in a car to Lapua.

The Movement used violence to apply pressure to the government and parliament to stop communist activity in Finland. Meetings held by leftist and labour groups were also interrupted, often violently. A common tactic was "muilutus" or "kyyditys", which started with kidnapping and beating. After that the subject was thrown into a car and driven to the border with the Soviet Union. Many of the Finns deported by the Lapua Movement were later caught up in Stalin's Great Purge and executed; while persecuted in Finland as communists, Stalin accused them of being "Nationalists".

After the Vaasa riot, witnessing the Kyösti Kallio led government's inability to control the situation, the Movement reiterated their demands with regards to communist organizations and papers and declared June 15th as the deadline for fulfilling them. The government was unwilling to use the military or the police to restore order, because it believed them to sympathize with the Movement. Instead President Lauri Relander asked former Prime Minister P. E. Svinhufvud, whom the Finnish right wing greatly respected, to negotiate with the movement. Svinhufvud convinced Kosola and the other leaders that there was a legal way to achieve their goals and aided them in formulating a plan to remove communists through parliamentary means.

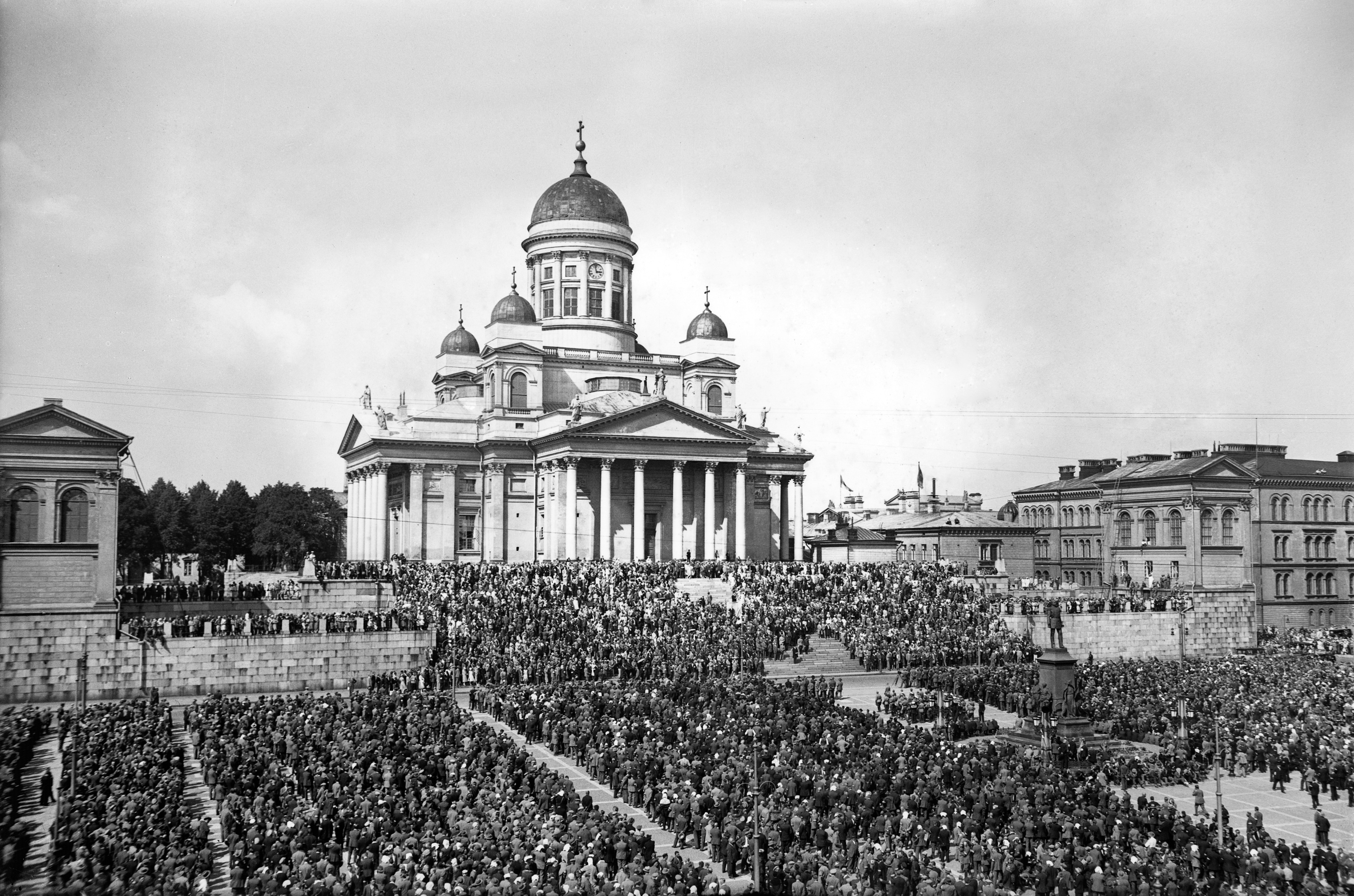
The Peasant March gathered on Senate Square

On July 1st the government brought the so-called Communist Laws to a vote and resigned the following day. Svinhufvud became the new prime minister as the Lapua Movement had wished, but he refused to make Vihtori Kosola a member of cabinet or to arrest communist members of parliament. In response Kosola ordered the abductions of members of parliament Jalmari Rötkö and Eino Pekkala. The Lapua Movement had planned a massive show of force, the "Peasant March", to be held on July 7th. Kosola was persuaded to release the abductees when Svinhufvud informed him that he would not be there to greet the marchers otherwise. The Peasant March gathered 12,600 men to Helsinki where they marched through the city, held speeches and sermons and were greeted by distinguished politicians and generals.

Of the Communist Laws, changes to the Freedom of the Press Act were this time accepted by parliament with a simple majority, but the Protection of the Republic Act was considered a constitutional law and thereby required a five sixths majority to pass immediately. Social Democrats were only willing to accept the law for a three year temporary period, which meant that the Act only received a simple majority and had to be voted on by the next parliament. On July 15th the President disbanded the parliament and called for an election.

Failure to pass all the Communist Laws led to a new wave of abductions and beatings by the Lapua Movement over the autumn of 1930. Vihtori Kosola's outspoken goal was to let society deteriorate to a state of anarchy, which would make dictatorship a preferable alternative to people. Other more moderate leaders of the Movement however no longer accepted the abductions and, in September, convinced Kosola to stop them. Most notable cases over this period were the abduction of Väinö Hakkila, a Social Democrat vice-chairman of parliament, and that of the municipal politician Onni Happonen, who was killed and confirmed to not actually be a communist.

Before the election the Lapua Movement was also involved in electoral fraud. The Movement's violent reputation was used to intimidate socialist voters to either abstain or to vote for right wing candidates, Social Democratic Party members were harassed on the campaign trail and hustings were interrupted, and guards were organized around polling stations. Voters perceived as communists were also outright removed from electoral rolls.

After the election right wing parties had the majority they needed to pass the remaining Communist Laws. Despite this the most infamous abduction was carried out on 14 October 1930 when the popular ex-president Kaarlo Juho Ståhlberg and his wife Ester were kidnapped and taken to Joensuu. After this, general support for the movement collapsed. More moderate people left the movement, and extremists became more influential.

== Failed rebellion ==
In February 1932 a Social Democrat meeting in Mäntsälä was violently interrupted by armed Lapua activists. The event escalated to an attempted coup d'état known as the Mäntsälä rebellion (Mäntsälän kapina), led by the former Chief of Staff of Finland's army, General Wallenius. Despite the appeals of Wallenius, the army and the White Guards were largely loyal to the government. Many historians believe the main reason for the failure was poor planning: the event just escalated from actions of the local chapter and the national organization came aboard later. The rebellion ended after President Svinhufvud gave a radio speech to the rebels. After a trial, the Lapua Movement was banned on 21 November 1932 under the Protection of the Republic Act, which Lapua itself had worked to get passed. Wallenius and about 50 other leaders were sentenced to prison.

== Legacy ==
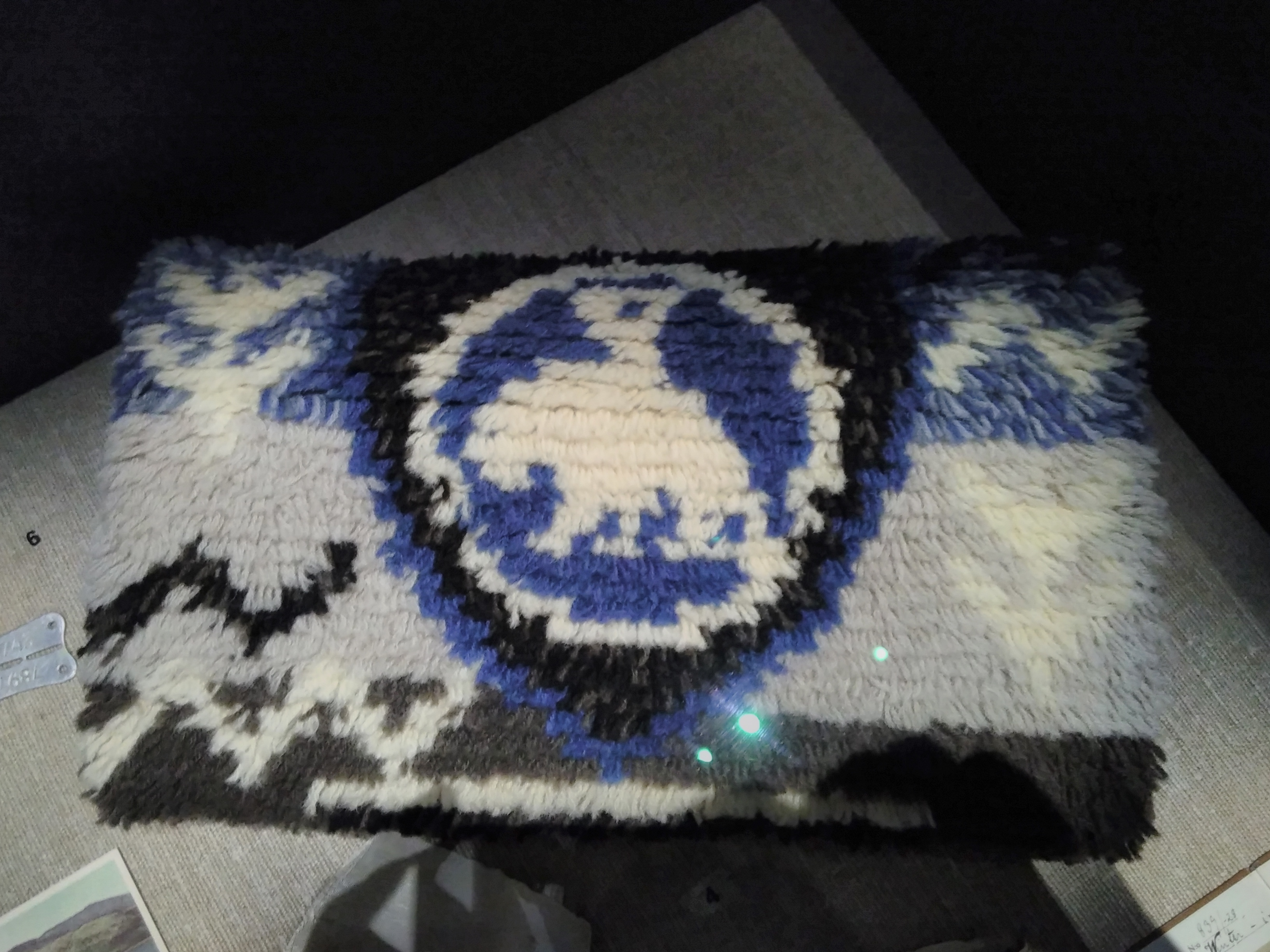
Woven textile with the emblem of Lapua Movement or the Patriotic People's Movement, seen in the National Museum of Finland

After the Lapua Movement was banned, the Patriotic People's Movement was formed shortly thereafter. Like its predecessor, it also was nationalist and anti-communist. It had limited political success and was banned in 1944 on the orders of the Soviet Union in the aftermath of the Continuation War.

== See also ==
- Continuation War
- Heimosodat
- History of Finland
- Minna Craucher
- Politics of Finland
- Vaps Movement (Estonia)
- Winter War
