= Ståhlberg kidnapping =

1930 kidnapping of former Finnish President Ståhlberg and his wife by far-right radicals

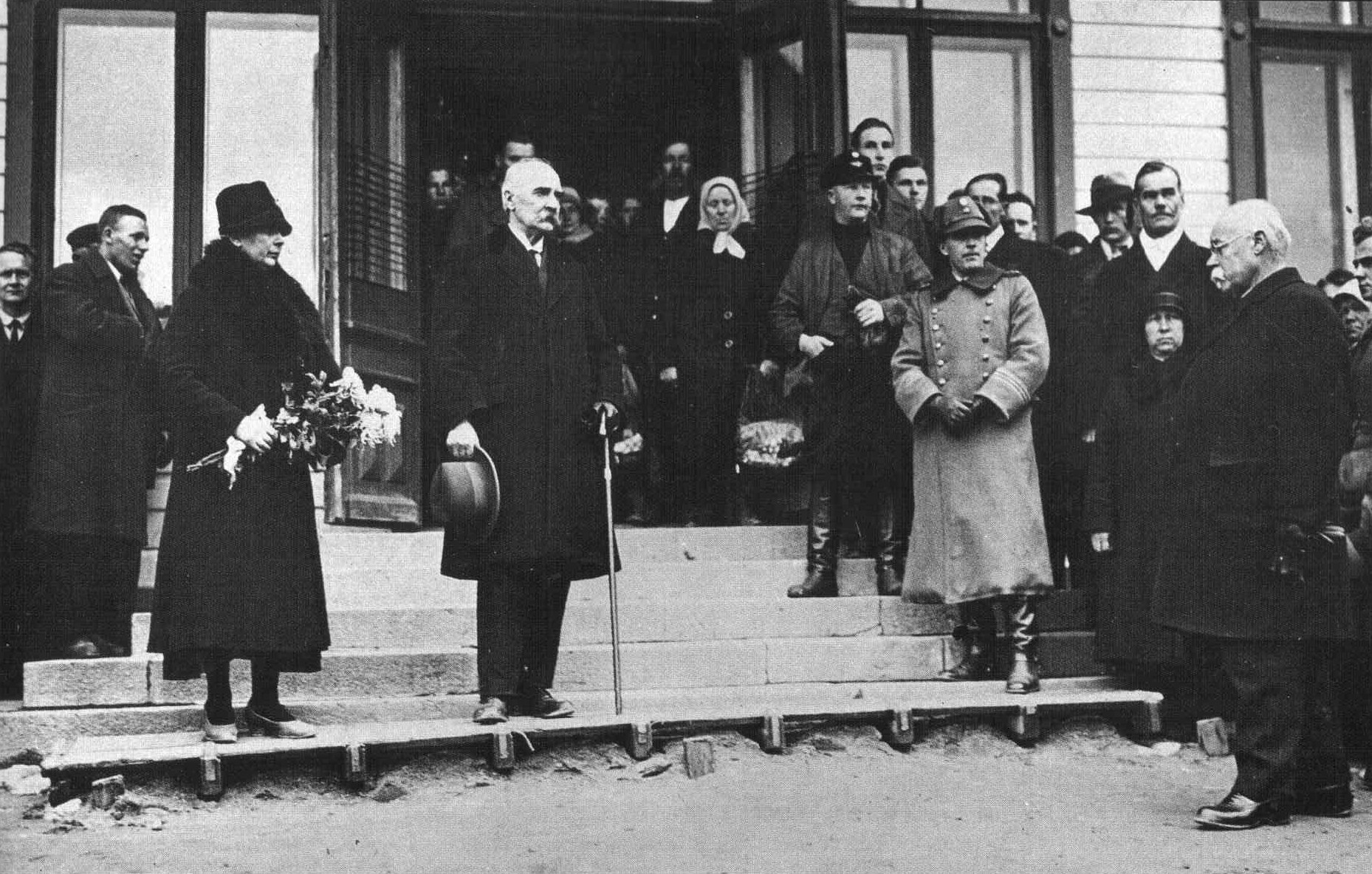
K.J. and Ester Ståhlberg at Joensuu railway station on October 15, 1930, one day after their kidnapping

On October 14, 1930, at approximately 9:00 am EET, former and first President of Finland, Kaarlo Juho Ståhlberg, and his wife, Ester Ståhlberg, were abducted near their home in Helsinki, Finland, by members of the far-right Lapua Movement.

The plan was spearheaded by ex-White Guard general Kurt Martti Wallenius. The kidnappers threatened to execute both hostages if their demands were not met, but were ultimately hesitant to carry out the threat. The pair were taken by car to Joensuu in Eastern Finland, where they were abruptly set free after the kidnappers failed to meet up with other accomplices.

In December 1930, Wallenius and Eero Kuussaari were found guilty of the kidnapping and sentenced to 3 years of penal servitude and dismissal from the army.

The incident greatly eroded the already dwindling popular support for the Lapua Movement. The kidnapping was also considered decisive in the victory of Pehr Evind Svinhufvud against Ståhlberg in the 1931 presidential election. After the kidnapping, the Lapuans again threatened to assassinate Ståhlberg.

== Reaction ==
The abduction was widely covered in foreign newspapers.

In Sweden, the news caused a diplomatic incident when Dagens Nyheter wrote that "such news should come from Mexico or one of the 'Banana republics' and not from a Western European state", to which the Mexican ambassador in Stockholm protested vehemently.

== In popular culture ==
Ståhlberg's kidnapping inspired the 2026 film The Kidnapping of a President.
