= Young Communist League of Finland =

The Young Communist League of Finland (Finnish: Suomen kommunistinen nuorisoliitto, SKNL) was the youth organization of the Communist Party of Finland (SKP) 1925–1936. The organization was clandestine, but had a significant impact in Finnish society. SKNL was a section of the Communist Youth International.

== History ==
=== Establishment ===
Prior to the founding of SKNL, the SKP worked through public organizations such as the Socialist Youth League of Finland (banned 1923) and the Socialist Youth League. An effective underground youth organization was not established while it was still possible to work publicly. Gradually, young members of the SKP began setting up secret party cells of their own. In 1923 the Communist Youth International proposed the formation of a communist youth league in Finland. Activity towards the build-up of the organization intensified and in August 1924, the SKP began publishing Nuori Kommunisti ('Young Communist'). In early 1925 an organiser was hired to build the movement and the SKNL was thus founded. In May, the league had 250 members.

=== Initial period ===
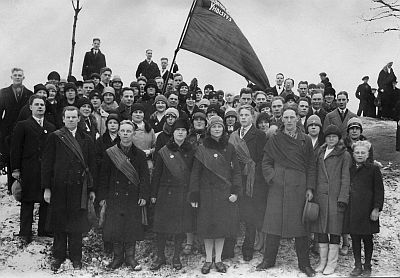
Activists of the Helsinki Young Workers Study Circle, a SKNL front, photographed on May Day, 1927

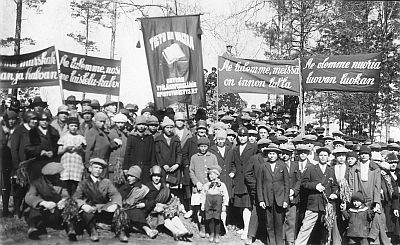
Members of the Kotka Young Workers Study Circle, May Day 1928

The work of SKNL was difficult due to the repression by the state machinery. However, in the period 1925-1926 SKNL cells were set up around the country. As of September 1925 the SKNL had cells in the Helsinki, Tampere, Pori, Vaasa, Lappeenranta, Vyborg and Kuopio regions. In total there were 40 cells, with 149 members. The SKNL was active in the 1927 parliamentary election, campaigning for the Socialist Electoral Organisation of Workers and Smallholders. The youth activist Toivo Latva was elected to parliament.

The first conference of SKNL was held in Moscow, August 1927. At that time, the organization had 94 cells and 358 members. The second conference, which was attended by eight delegates, took place in connection with the congress of the Communist Youth International in August 1928. By then the membership had reached approximately 600, out of whom 20% were women.

In early 1928 SKNL experienced setbacks, when police arrested dozens of communists after information had been revealed by the arrested SKP organizer Jalmari Rasi. SKNL cadres such as Jaakko Kivi, Väinö Vuorio and Emil Paananen were arrested. Eino Lehto and Nestori Parkkari remained at large for a brief period, before going into exile in the Soviet Union. In May 1929 the SKNL organizer Matti Dahl was caught by police, and documents seized from him were used to arrest SKNL activists such as Eino Hellfors, Jussi Siltanen, Aino Kallio and Toivo Lång.

The first congress of SKNL was held in Stockholm, Sweden, August 10-August 15, 1929. The delegates from Finland travelled by boat from Helsinki or, clandestinely, by motorboat from Jakobstad. The delegates residing in the Soviet Union travelled via Germany. In total there were 22 delegates at the congress. Initially the Stockholm City Library had been selected as the congress venue, but in order to avoid police infiltration the venue was shifted to a private residence. Whilst the congress reaffirmed its commitment to the legacy of the Communist Youth International, it did also criticize the International for not paying enough attention to the sections working in illegal conditions. The congress elected a Central Committee of the SKNL. The new leadership got into trouble as soon as they returned Finland. The police was able to identify several congress participants. In late 1929 the leadership of SKNL included Heikki Ilvesviita, Toivo Karvonen, Tatu Väätäinen, Paavo Kivikoski, Aatto Sallinen, Aili Mäkinen, Airi Virtanen and Reino Tynkkynen.

1929 saw a rise in clashes between communists demonstrators and police forces. SKP and SKNL formed special defence groups to engage in street-fights with the police. In response, police raided the offices of various organisations connected to SKP and SKNL in Helsinki. Many SKNL cadres were arrested. SKNL also argued intensely against the so-called vacillators, the Left Group of Finnish Workers, which split from the communist controlled fronts after getting fed up with the Comintern's Third Period policies.

=== Liquidation ===
In the mid-1930s the Communist International and the Communist Youth International began to orient themselves towards building popular fronts against fascism. The SKNL was directed to work within the Social Democratic Labour Youth League (STL), the youth wing of the Social Democratic Party of Finland. At the time the activity of STL was very low. The secret SKNL cells became fractional units inside the STL. The STL leadership did not like the infiltration, and they instructed district organizations to be vigilant against communist influences. At the STL congress in May 1937 there were around 20-30 representatives of the leftwing opposition, a grouping indirectly tied to the SKNL. Gradually SKNL ceased to function, but the SKP retained some youth work of its own. In 1944, the Democratic Youth League of Finland was founded as the new SKP youth organization.

== Organisation ==
The members of SKNL were organised in small cells, under the political direction of district organisations. Due to the conspiratory nature of the SKNL organisation, it never became a mass movement. The organisation itself claimed that the membership peaked at around 2,000, but a more realistic figure is that the total membership never reached much higher than 1,000. In the labour movement the existence of SKNL was known, but most people did not know who belonged to the league and/or how it functioned.

SKNL organised young people between the ages of 14 and 24. Its constitution stipulated that SKNL was an independent organisation, but under the political leadership of SKP. SKP and SKNL were bound to assist each other in all types of activities. The highest decision-making body of SKNL was the congress and the Central Committee. As of 1928 there were seven district organisations of SKNL; Helsinki, Tampere, Vaasa, Viipuri, Kuopio, Oulu and Turku.

In 1926 SKP established a youth bureau in Moscow, in order to assist SKNL. The organisers of the youth bureau included Toivo Antikainen, Pekka Paasonen, Hannes Mäkinen, Kaarlo Kosunen, Hertta Kuusinen, Inkeri Lehtinen, Eino Lehto and Ville Honkanen.

In the 1920s, left-wing early youth (under 14) work was organised inside Työväen Järjestönuorten Liitto. After the TJN was banned this became responsibility of the SKNL. Pioneer groups were built and in the beginning of 1931 a new national organisation was formed under the guidance of SKNL. The SKNL pioneers had activity in the biggest cities and it published Pioneeri. SKNL decided to close down the pioneer wing in 1934–1935.

=== Organs ===
The central organ of SKNL was Nuori Kommunisti, which was published clandestinely in Helsinki. In spite of various arrests, the organization was able to bring out an issue of Nuori Kommunisti almost every month. SKNL also published and distributed documents of the Communist Youth International. The propaganda of SKNL reached almost every corner of the country. In 1928 Nuori Kommunisti had a circulation of just 175 copies, but by 1932 the number had increased to 1,100 copies. Another publication, Nuori Kaarti was also set up. In the period of 1932-1933 the (tens of different) SKNL publications had a combined circulation of about 15 000.

Other publications under the influence of SKNL included the literary magazine Liekki (1923–1930). In 1929 Liekki became a political weekly, and had a circulation of 10 000 copies.

During the 1920s, there were also several local publications of SKNL led youth committees such as Taisteleva Nuoriso (Uusimaa), Aate (Turku), Punainen Nuoriso (Vaasa) and Punainen Pohjola (Oulu).

=== Relationship with the Communist Youth International ===
As a section of the Communist Youth International, SKNL had to act according to the decisions taken by the International. SKNL had its own representative of the secretariat of the Communist Youth International. Initially, SKNL was represented by Pekka Paasonen. In the beginning of 1927 he was replaced by Kaarlo Kosunen, who in August 1928 was replaced by Inkeri Lehtinen. The fifth world congress of the CYI which was held in 1928 was attended by SKNL delegation consisting of Eino Lehto, Nestori Parkkari, Toivo Karvonen and Eino Hellfors. By the end of 1927 or in 1928, the programme of the CYI was published in Finnish language. The sixth world congress of the International, held in 1935, was attended by the SKNL delegate Veikko Sippola.
