= Jalmari Rötkö =

Finnish politician (1892–1938)

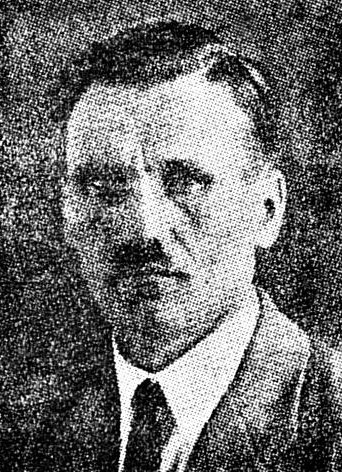
Jalmari Rötkö in 1929

Hjalmar (Jalmari) Rötkö (13 August 1892, Suomenniemi – 19 July 1938) was a Finnish labourer and politician. He was a member of the Parliament of Finland from 1929 to 1930, representing the Socialist Electoral Organisation of Workers and Smallholders (STPV).

Rötkö served as a member of parliament for the parliamentary group of Socialist Workers and Small Farmers, representing the Western Constituency of Viipur County, from 1929 to 1930. However, during the session of the parliament's constitutional committee on July 5 or July 7, 1930, Rötkö and another parliament member from the same group, Eino Pekkala, were confronted by members of the fascist Lapua Movement, led by Kosti-Paavo Eerolainen and Artturi Vuorimaa, at Helsinki's Säätytalo. In response to this incident, both representatives were escorted to Vihtori Kosola's residence in Lapua. The subsequent release of the individuals by Kosola, who was in Helsinki at the time, was in accordance with his previous instruction to escalate efforts for the complete exclusion of communists from the parliament.

== See also ==
- List of kidnappings
