= Mäntsälä rebellion =

Attempted coup d'état in Finland in 1932

- Part of the political violence in Finland (1918–1932)
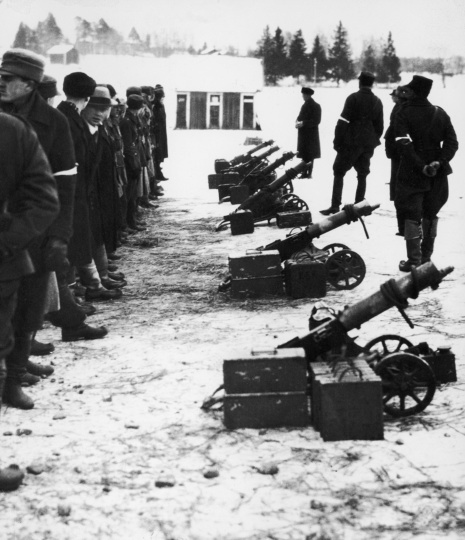
- Rebel machine guns
Date	27 February – 6 March 1932
Location	Mäntsälä, Jyväskylä, Salo, Seinäjoki, Pori
Result	Finnish government victory: Lapua Movement banned

Belligerents
(Finland) Finnish Government	Lapua Movement

Commanders and leaders
Aarne Sihvo; P. E. Svinhufvud	Artturi Vuorimaa (surrendered); Vihtori Kosola (surrendered); K. M. Wallenius (surrendered)

Strength
Unknown at the time	500 in Mäntsälä, 5,000 in the whole country

Casualties and losses
None	1 suicide, 52 imprisoned

The Mäntsälä rebellion (Finnish: Mäntsälän kapina, Swedish: Mäntsäläupproret) was a failed coup attempt by the Lapua Movement to overthrow the Finnish government.

On 27 February 1932, some 400 armed members of the Civil Guards had interrupted a meeting of Social Democrats in Mäntsälä with small arms fire. This action had been done by a regional sect of the movement, however, the national organization soon joined in. In the next few days, leading members of the Lapua Movement and hundreds of armed members of Civil Guards arrived at Mäntsälä. The former Chief of General Staff Major General Wallenius also joined the leadership of the rebellion. The men refused to disperse and demanded the cabinet's resignation and a change in political course.

Two days later, the cabinet ordered the leaders of the Lapua Movement arrested using the Protection of the Republic Act which the movement itself had urged for a year before. Army units prepared as the Chief of Defence, Lieutenant General Aarne Sihvo was prepared to use force to end the rebellion. Orders were given to reinforce the defence of Helsinki with tanks and artillery in case the situation worsened. As the tensions grew, so did the consumption of alcohol among the instigators.

On 2 March 1932, President Pehr Evind Svinhufvud gave a radio speech in which he urged the militiamen to return home and promised that only the leaders would be punished. The President's speech was as follows:

"Having taken over today as Commander-in-Chief of the Armed Forces and the Defense Forces in order to restore order to the country, I hereby personally appeal to all members of the Defense Forces and others who have left you with armed violence and command them to return to their homes. No one has the right to leave their community armed without the permission of an officer, and no one should turn their ears to instigators and recruiters who try to incite citizens to go hand in hand in the fight against the legitimate social order. Throughout my long life, I have fought to uphold the law and justice and I cannot allow the law to now be trampled underfoot and citizens to be led into an armed battle against each other. The White Guard will suffer unpredictable damage in the future if some of the members of White Guard now forget their oath and engage in a struggle against the social order they have vowed to the death and blood to defend. Now that I have taken it upon myself, independently of anyone, to take responsibility for restoring peace to the country, every conspiracy is henceforth directed not only at law and order, but also at me personally, who myself have marched in the ranks of White Guard as a peacemaker. I would also like to say to those many who, already remorseful of their mistake, are concerned about the punishment that threatens them, that if they immediately return to their domestic chores, they will not face any punishment unless they have been instigators of rebellion. Peace must be brought to the land as a matter of urgency, and the grievances of our state life must then be resolved in a lawful manner."

The men dispersed and the leaders were arrested a few days later. In spring, the Lapua Movement was disbanded. Only a small part of the Civil Guards had joined the rebels, while the majority remained loyal to the government. On 16 July 1932, an indictment sought the punishment of 102 rebels. Of these defendants, 52 of them received prison terms, 32 received conditional prison terms, 20 of them were pardoned, and 24 were released without any criminal convictions.

The Mäntsälä rebellion can be considered the last major radical-right-wing incident in Finland after the Civil War. In the coming years, the economic situation in Finland would improve and radical movements would lose support.

== See also ==
- History of Finland
- Political violence in Finland (1918–1932)
