= Antti Salamaa =

Finnish politician (1899–1935)

Antti Salamaa, formerly Salomaa and before that Mielonen (May 30, 1899 Uukuniemi - October 17, 1935 Helsinki) was a Finnish sailor and former police officer who became famous in 1929 when he was the secretary of the Lalli Alliance of Finland.

== Life ==
Salamaa went to public school and folk high school. He left for Australia afterwards and returned to Finland as a sailor in 1925. He then served as a police officer in Kotka, Pyhtää and Kirkkonummi and in Vallisaari as an ammunition depot guard before joining the Lalli Alliance in February 1929. The Alliance was planning a march of 12,000 men to Helsinki, scheduled for August 1929, with the aim of dissolving parliament and setting up a dictator. The march of Mussolini's black shirts to Rome in 1922 was considered an example.

In the autumn of 1929, Salamaa wrote a booklet Valtiovalta Suomalaisille, published by Lennartti Pohjanheimo, who was also a member of the Lalli Alliance. According to the booklet, all of Finland's problems were due to the country's Swedish speakers and they would be solved by making the country monolingual.

Salamaa was later involved in the activities of the National Socialist Union of Finland, founded in 1932 by Yrjö Ruutu and Juhani Konkka. The Ministry of Justice ordered the confiscation of the book Tilintarkastelua ruotsalaisuuden ja suomalaisuuden välillä (Reckoning between Swedishness and Finnishness), published under the pseudonym Aatami Salama in 1934, because the book was considered to undermine the government and the legal order, endanger Finland's relations with foreign powers and cause unrest among the public. Salamaa was also prosecuted for the book.

== Works ==
- Valtiovalta suomalaisille. Suomen Valta, Helsinki 1929
- Tilintarkastelua ruotsalaisuuden ja suomalaisuuden välillä. Tekijä, Helsinki 1934
