= Carl-Gustaf Herlitz =

Finnish politician and businessman (1882-1961)

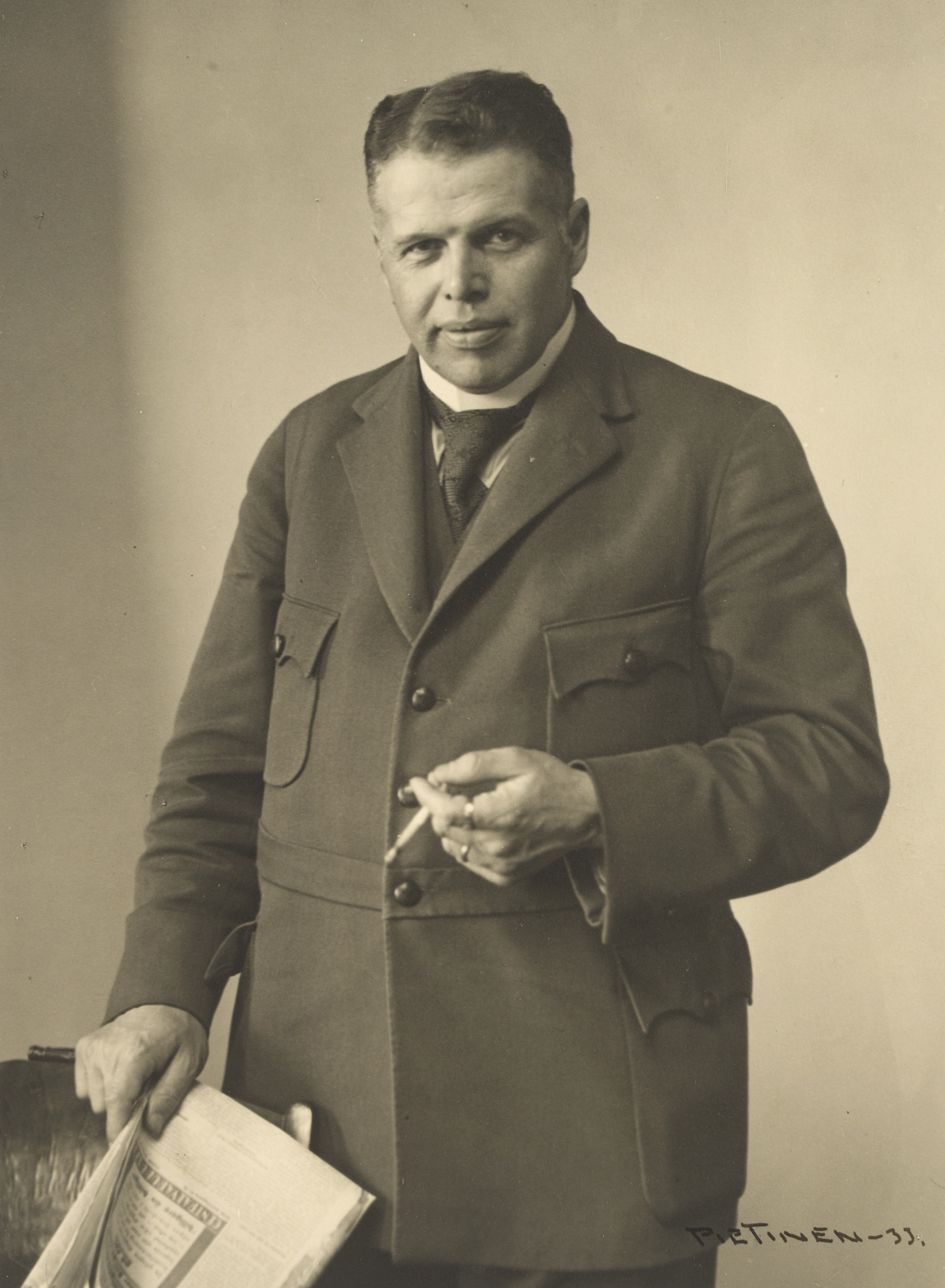
- Carl-Gustaf Herlitz year 1933.
- Born: 11 March 1882; Helsinki, Grand Duchy of Finland
- Died: 4 July 1961 (aged 79); Helsinki, Finland
- Occupation: CEO of Arabia (1916–1947)
- Title: vuorineuvos
- Board member of: Finnish Confederation of Employers (1921–1929, 1937–1947); Finnish Society of Crafts and Design deputy chairman (1922–1927)

Carl-Gustaf Victor Herlitz (Helsinki, 11 March 1882 – Helsinki, 4 July 1961) was a Finnish business director and Vuorineuvos. He was the managing director of the Arabia porcelain factory in Helsinki from 1916 to 1947, when the Herlitz family was a major owner of Arabia. During his time, Arabia expanded its operations and became the largest company in the Nordic countries in its field. Herlitz was a member of the board of the Finnish Confederation of Employers in 1921–1929 and 1937–1947, and a representative of the Swedish People's Party in the Helsinki City Council from 1931 to 1934. Herlitz was radical right-wing in his political views and advocated a hard line in relation to the trade union movement.

== Leader of Arabia ==
Carl-Gustaf Herlitz belonged to the Swedish Herlitz family. His father was Gustaf Herlitz, who was the technical director of the Arabian plant set up in Helsinki by the Swedish Rörstrand group and, from 1893, the managing director. Carl-Gustaf Herlitz graduated from the Polytechnic College in 1906 as a chemical engineer and then worked in Arabia. When the Arabia factory became the property of a Finnish consortium in 1916, Herlitz became the main owners of the factory. At the same time, Gustaf Herlitz handed over the duties of CEO to his son.

Herlitz drew up a major reform plan for Arabia, which began in 1919. The Helsinki plant was expanded and efforts were made to rationalize production. In 1923, Arabia bought the bankrupt Turku porcelain factory, which manufactured electrical insulated porcelain, and Herlitz became its managing director. In order to raise additional capital, Arabia's shares were later sold to the German Arnold Group, but when the Germans did not want to invest enough in Arabia, the Finns bought the shares back in 1927. At the same time, the Swedish porcelain factories in Lidköping and Rörstrand were transferred to Arabia. In the 1930s, Arabia became an internationally significant manufacturer of toilet seats and art ceramics.

Of great importance was the chemical engineering laboratory established by Herlitz for Arabia in 1922, where new materials were tested. In addition, Herlitz brought new foreign technology to Finland, which made it possible to streamline the work process at the Arabia plant. He was also the first in Finland to introduce the Bedaux method, based on standardization and labor standards, which represented Tayloristic rationalization and used to tighten the pace of work.

During the war, Herlitz launched a new expansion of the Helsinki plant, which was completed in 1947. Due to large investments and declining wartime sales, Arabia ran into financial difficulties in the post-war years, so Herlitz had to sell its shares to Wärtsilä in 1947 . At the same time, he resigned as CEO and was succeeded by engineer Gunnar Ståhle.

== Other work ==
Herlitz was a member of the board of the Finnish Confederation of Employers (STK) in 1921–1929 and 1937–1947. He was strictly right-wing in his political views and advocated a hard line in relation to the trade union movement. [1] The first shop steward could be elected to the Arabia plant only after the political conditions in Finland changed after the Continuation War, and even then Herlitz tried to dismiss the new shop steward as his first job, but after the strike he had to accept the workers' organization. On the other hand, during the Winter War in 1940, he was involved in the so-called Betrothal of January, in which the trade union movement was recognized as a negotiating party.

Herlitz was a right-wing member of the Swedish People's Party (RKP) and represented the RKP in the Helsinki City Council from 1931 to 1934. In the 1940s, he also supported Teo Snellman's Finnish National Socialist Labor Organisation. During the Continuation War, Herlitz was influential in pro-German circles. He formed a counter petition to the "statement of the thirty-three" of the Peace opposition and was one of the funders and backers of the Aftonposten newspaper, founded in the summer of 1944 by Swedish-speaking right-wing radicals. After the war, he supported Rütger Essén's far-right magazines Dagsposten and Fria Ordia.

Herlitz spread antisemitic propaganda publicly even after the war. In 1954 and 1957 he published two antisemitic pamphlets, which he distributed in Finland and Sweden and which he also translated into Finnish. In them, he presented conspiracy theories that Jews ruled the world and were guilty of both world wars as well as the upcoming World War III. Carl-Ernfrid Carlberg, who distributed Herlitz's pamphlet in Stockholm schools, was fined by the Swedish Supreme Court for inciting hatred. In the 1950s, Herlitz published articles in Swedish newspapers with similar content, in which he also claimed that the Holocaust was a lie.

Herlitz was the vice-president of the Finnish Arts and Crafts Association and in 1922–1927 the chairman of the Muntra Musikanter singing society. He was awarded the title of Vuorineuvos in 1932.

Swedish lawyer and politician Nils Herlitz was a cousin of Carl-Gustaf Herlitz.

== Works ==
- Tankar över sammanhanget mellan tillverknings- och försäljningsmomenten i ett affärsföretag (1934), in Finnish Ajatuksia valmistus- ja myyntitoiminnan välisestä riippuvaisuussuhteesta liikeyrityksessä
- Teollisuuden tehtävistä suhdannevaihteluiden tasoittajana (1936)
- Om industrin och tidens problem (1941), in Finnish Teollisuus ja nykyajan probleemit
- Työtutkimuksista, niiden tarkoitusperistä ja tekniikasta (1943)
- Industrins samhällsuppgift (1945), in Finnish Teollisuuden yhteiskunnallinen tehtävä
- En ny fabrikationslinje inom den vita keramiken (1953)
- Något om tidens största fråga (1954), in Finnish in 1956 Sananen aikamme suurimmasta kysymyksestä
- Några synpunkter på vad som hänt och händer i världen (1957), in Finnish Maailmantapahtumat eilen ja tänään eräiden näkökohtien valossa
