= Stormers (Finland) =

Stormers Iskumiehet
- Leader: Vietti Nykänen
- Founded: 1933
- Dissolved: 1934
- Split from: National Socialist Union of Finland
- Merged into: Patriotic People's Movement
- Newspaper: Isku
- Ideology: Fascism
- Political position: Far-right

Stormers (Finnish: Iskumiehet) was a Finnish far-right party operating in the early 1930s, led by architect Vietti Nykänen.

== History ==
The party was founded in March 1933, when Nykänen, a member of the National Socialist Union of Finland (SKSL), resigned and founded his own party with his supporters. The Stormers' key demands included lower rents, an increase in banknote stocks and work for the unemployed. The far-left Communist Party of Finland considered the rhetoric of the Stormers to be more dangerous than the SKSL.

Of the other far-right parties, Iskumiehet attacked the Patriotic People's Movement's desire to ban social democratic organizations. According to the Stormers, the people should not be divided by such measures, even though the left had to be fought. The Stormers co-operated with the Party of Finnish Labor (which represented the same position).

The organ of the Stormers was Isku (Attack), which appeared from January to April 1933 and was edited by M. Tauriala. Isku's propaganda was aggressive. Already the second issue of the magazine was prosecuted under the Freedom of the Press Act and its copies were confiscated. The reason for the measure was Isku's attacks on the state alcohol monopoly and the National Equity Bank. Isku also attacked Helsingin Sanomat for covering the attacks on Jews in Germany, claiming Sanomat had "chosen the side of the Jew" in the fight between Jews and Gentiles.

In the autumn of 1933, Chairman Nykänen got into disputes with his party colleagues. The opposition accused Nykänen of the autocracy he had shown during the election campaign. Nykänen had visited the left-wing organization without consulting the party board. As a result, disappointed supporters left the party under the leadership of merchant Lennart Mäkelä. The split operated for a while under the name Iskujoukot (Stormtroopers), until Mäkelä founded the Finnish Workers' and Peasants' Alliance in 1934. Vietti Nykänen joined the Patriotic People's Movement in 1934.

== Election results ==
=== Parliament of Finland ===
Date	Votes			Seats		Position	Size
Date	#	%	± pp	#	±	Position	Size
1933	787	0.07%	+ 0.07	0 / 200	▲	No seats	12th
