= Radical People's Party =

Radical People's Party may refer to one of the following political parties:

- Free-minded People's Party (Germany) of Germany, also translated as Radical People's Party
- Radical People's Party (Finland)
- Radical People's Party (Norway)
