= Finnish National Socialist Labor Organisation =

Finnish National Socialist Labor Organisation Suomen Kansallissosialistinen Työjärjestö
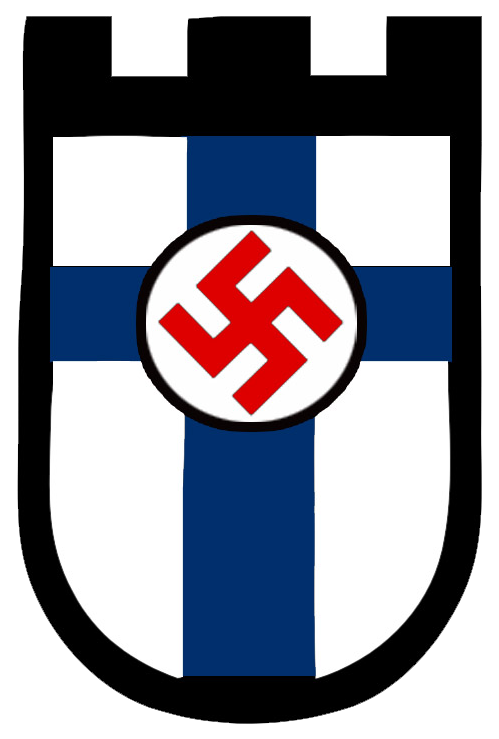
- Leader: Teo Snellman
- Founded: 1940
- Dissolved: 1944
- Headquarters: Helsinki, Kasarmikatu 28
- Newspaper: Vapaa Suomi, Ny Tid
- Youth wing: Young Realm Builders
- Ideology: Nazism
- Political position: Far-right

The Finnish National Socialist Labor Organisation (Finnish: Suomen Kansallissosialistinen Työjärjestö, SKT) was a Finnish Nazi party led by Teo Snellman. The movement that operated during the armistice and the Continuation War was also known as the National Reform Labor Organization (Kansallisen Uudistustyön Työjärjestö, KUT) and the Finnish National Socialist Workers' Party (Suomen Kansallissosialistinen Työväenpuolue, SKTP). The party's organ was Vapaa Suomi ('Free Finland'), which appeared between 1940 and 1944.

SKT and SKTP were abolished on the basis of Article 21 of the peace agreement concluded between Finland and the Soviet Union on September 23, 1944, immediately on the same day as the agreement was approved and entered into force.

== Founding ==
Acting as a diplomat, Teo Snellman became bitter against the state when his career was interrupted in 1934 by a scandal. Snellman thought himself innocent, blamed the Jews, and began writing for various newspapers on the far right. He became acquainted with Nazism and was in contact with, among others, the Finnish-Socialist Workers' Party.

After the Winter War, Snellman began planning new organizations. In June 1940, the weekly newspaper Vapaa Suomi began publication, declaring itself a supporter of the "national reform movement". In August 1940, the magazine organized an open event where participants decided to establish a National Reform Organization to advance the ideas put forward by Snellman.

KUT actively disseminated propaganda and organized study clubs. In addition to Snellman, the events were hosted by Eino Tilus, Hans Kalm, Toivo Loikkanen, Lauri Leinonen and Arvi Nuorimo. Artturi Vuorimaa taught young people. By the spring of 1941, local organizations were established in 13 municipalities outside Helsinki.

In mid-September 1940, KUT founded the security department Stormers, led by SS man Edvard Karvonen.

=== SKT ===
The name of the KUT was changed to SKT in October 1940. The change was justified by the fact that the KUT's policies were fully in line with the basic ideas of Nazism. At the same time, an organization logo was introduced: a shield with the Finnish flag, a red swastika circled in the middle of the cross on a white background. The formal founding meeting of SKT was held on November 8, 1940. In addition to Snellman, the founding members were Eino Tilus and Arvi Nuorimo. SKT was entered in the register of associations in April 1940. In the summer of 1941 SKT already had 49 local chapters and multiple chapters in Helsinki.

== Program ==
The SKT program took shape in stages. The first seven-paragraph version was published in October 1940 and a longer version in the same year. The program was finalized in December 1941. The party program was a synthesis of Teo Snellman's ideas and the 1920 program of the German Nazi Party (German: Nationalsozialistische Deutsche Arbeiterpartei, NSDAP). It supported, among other things, strong leadership, organic civil society and a corporatist state. Parliamentarism and economic liberalism were condemned. According to the program, Finland had to join the Nazi-led "new Europe". SKT wanted to protect the Finnish race by removing foreign elements such as Jews. There was a desire to ban interracial marriages. SKT also called for strict censorship, land reform and improvement of the position of the Finnish language.

In a pamphlet published with Jussi Leino in 1942, Finnish National Socialism, Snellman divided Finnish history into three periods. The first related to the Kalevala, the second to the Reformation, and the third to the national awakening. Snellman considered the third period to be the starting point of Finnish National Socialism, and SKT declared Johan Vilhelm Snellman (Teo's grandfather) to be the first Finnish National Socialist. According to Leino, the Hegelian influences of J. V. Snellman in particular laid the foundation for the idea. The early 1940s, according to Snellman, ushered in a new phase of "organic renewal," which began with the experiences of the Winter War that created a new kind of civil society.

According to Snellman, the movement he led represented the third phase of the Lapua movement. According to Snellman, the Patriotic People's Movement, which represented the second stage, was too committed to parliamentarism.

Through Snellman, SKT had good connections with the German Nazis. According to Hans Metzger, Snellman admired Alfred Rosenberg and kept in touch with the Nazi Party's Foreign Policy Department (APA), which he led.

== Vapaa Suomi ==
The organ of the movement, Vapaa Suomi (Free Finland), appeared in 1940–1944. The newspaper had an office in Helsinki on Kasarmikatu. Café Aunus was also located on the premises. Vapaa Suomi had a Swedish-language sister publication, Ny Tid.

The magazine was assisted by poet Bertel Gripenberg, professor Johannes Öhquist and Y. W. Jalander, among others. Author Kaarlo Nuorvala was the editor-in-chief of the magazine for a while in the summer of 1942. Harry Donner, the largest financier of Vapaa Suomi, donated about half a million marks to it. The magazine was also supported with large sums by Tampella and Arabia.

== Young Realm Builders ==
SKT's youth organization Young Realm Builders (Finnish: Nuoret Valtakunnan Rakentajat, NVR) was founded in the autumn of 1940. The NVR was intended initially for 8–21 year olds and after registration (1943) for over 15 year olds. Upon joining, members made a sworn promise of decency and loyalty to leadership and the nation. The organization also had support especially among the youth of Kymenlaakso.

In 1943, the organization was led by Mauri Jalava. In the summer of 1943, the NVR founded a youth labor camp in Luopioinen under the leadership of Jalava. According to its rules, the purpose of the NVR was to strengthen the national and political cohesion of Finnish youth. In particular, the organization sought to increase the youth compulsory work duties and military training.

== Sources ==
- Ekberg, Henrik (1991). Führerns trogna följeslagare. Den finländska nazismen 1932–1944. Schildts. pp. 168–187. 951-50-0522-1.
