= Uoti =

Uoti is a surname. Notable people with the surname include:

- Ensio Uoti (1897–1966), Finnish politician
- Olli J. Uoti (1930–1967), Finnish social scientist
