= Jussi Leino =

Finnish politician

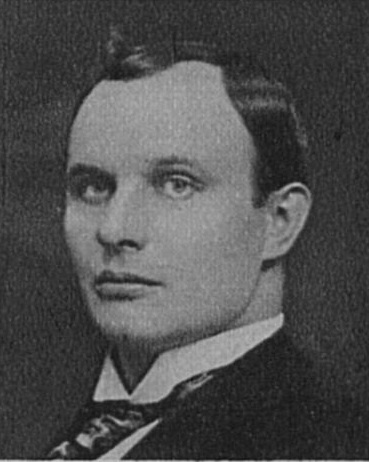

Frans Johannes (Jussi, FJ) Leino (October 14, 1894 in Lieto – April 27, 1960 in Kaarina) was a Finnish lawyer and Social Democrat Member of Parliament.

Leino's parents were farmworker Frans Henrik Leino and Alma Simola. He became a student in 1915 and graduated with a degree in law in 1919. Leino was a partner in the law firm Leino & Leino in Turku from 1919 to 1960. During the Finnish Civil War Leino worked at the Revolutionary Court as a legal councillor.

Leino was a Member of Parliament from 1924 to 1929, representing the southern constituency of Turku County. He was the presidential elector in the 1925 presidential election. Leino was also a member of the Turku City Council.

Leino defended over 40 communists in court charged with various offenses, by far the most in Finland. One of Leino's most famous clients was John Reed.

During the Continuation War, Leino participated in the activities of the Finnish National Socialist Labor Organisation, founded by Teo Snellman, and the Organisation of National Socialists, led by Yrjö Raikas, and he also published books on Nazism. In the autumn of 1944, Leino was arrested by the State Police together with many other Finnish Nazi leaders.

Jussi Leino was married to Marta Maria Raunio in 1916–1934 and from 1935 to Oili Tuulikki Tuominen.

== Books ==
- Kansallissosialismi maailmanhistoriallisen kehityksen tuloksena (National Socialism as the result of world historic development). Otava 1941
- Kansallissosialistisia mietelauseita (National Socialist aphorisms). Suomen kansallissosialistisen työväenpuolueen Turun p.o., Turku 1942
- Suomalainen kansallissosialismi luo uuden Sammon : Suomen uusi ohjelma (Finnish National Socialism creates the new Sampo: New program for Finland); kirj. Jussi Leino ja Teo Snellman. Suomen kansallissosialistinen työjärjestö, Helsinki 1942
