= Party of Finnish Labor =

Party of Finnish Labor Suomalaisen Työn Puolue
- Leader: Niilo Rauvala
- Secretary: Taavi Vanhanen
- Founded: 1932
- Dissolved: 1945
- Newspaper: Vapaa Suomi
- Ideology: Antisemitism; Finnish nationalism Finnish irredentism Protectionism; Nazism
- Political position: Far-right

The Party of Finnish Labor (Finnish: Suomalaisen Työn Puolue, STP) was a Finnish far-right party operating in the 1930s and 1940s, led by engineer Niilo Rauvala. The party's motto was: "Finland into a great and rich nation state". In 1940s, the organization was known as the New Finnish Party (Uusi Suomalainen Puolue). The party was dissolved on 18 January 1945 as contrary to Article 21 of the Moscow Armistice, which forbade fascist parties.

The party began when a group of Helsinki residents who were dissatisfied with the Free Workers' Union left the organization and decided to form a competing association. In October 1931, the Helsinki Rightist-Workers' Association was organized, and in August 1932, the same people decided to form the Rightist-Workers' and Peasants' Party (Oikeisto-Työväen ja Talonpoikain Puolue). The party was led by Niilo Rauvala, former vice-chairman of the Free Workers' Union. The first vice-chairman, Yrjö Säde, resigned from the organization as early as November 1932 and joined the Finnish People's Organisation (SKJ).

Rauvala was also the editor-in-chief of the Vapaa Suomi (Free Finland) magazine, published by the organization. The magazine, which was published from the beginning of September 1932, promoted, among other things, the Greater Finland idea and protectionist economics. The party was sympathetic to Nazism and Rauvala cooperated with the Nazi Finnish People's Organisation. Prior to the 1933 parliamentary elections, STP and SKJ entered into an electoral alliance, but SKJ withdrew from the project a month before the election. The party also published their edition of the Protocols of the Elders of Zion translated by Taavi Vanhanen. Their newspaper however attacked Yrjö Ruutu's National Socialist Union of Finland, accusing the party of cryptomarxism due to their Strasserist leanings. The main points of the party program were related to working conditions.

== Election results ==
=== Parliament of Finland ===
Date	Votes			Seats		Position	Size
Date	#	%	± pp	#	±	Position	Size
1933	226	0.02%	+ 0.02	0 / 200	▲	No seats	17th
