= Edvard Karvonen =

Finnish National socialist and a soldier

- Born: 19 July 1905; East Karelia, Russian Empire
- Died: 5 October 1973 (aged 68); Lahti, Finland
- Military career
- Allegiance: White Finland; Estonia; Nazi Germany; Finland
- Branch: White Guard; Pohjan Pojat; French Foreign Legion; Sturmabteilung; Schutzstaffel; Legion Condor; Finnish Army
- Rank: Vääpeli
- Nickname: Eetu
- Conflicts: Finnish Civil War; Estonian War of Independence; Kinship Wars; Aunus expedition; Spanish Civil War; World War II; Winter War; Continuation War
- Awards: Several Nazi awards

Edvard Karvonen (19 July 1905 - 5 October 1973) was a Finnish Nazi and a soldier.

== Biography ==
Karvonen was born in Eastern Karelia. He took part in the Battle of Viipuri as a 13-year-old. After the civil war, he took part in the Heimosodat in Estonia and the Aunus expedition and served in the French Foreign Legion between 1920 and 1923. In 1926 he moved to Germany and joined the Sturmabteilung and Schutzstaffel. While studying arts in Germany, he joined the Condor Legion and took part in the Spanish Civil War. He took part in the Winter War where he was wounded in the head and lost an eye. He was wounded 8 times during his life, for the last time in 1941 in the attack phase of the Continuation War, by the river Lotta.

Karvonen took part in the Lapua Movement, was a founding member of the Sortavala chapter of National Socialist Union of Finland and later the head of security of the Finnish National Socialist Labor Organisation.

Karvonen was a polyglot; he could fluently speak Swedish, Russian, German and Finnish.

== Family ==
Karvonen lived with his common law wife Olga Kekäläinen, a Finnish expatriate from the Soviet Union. They had one daughter.
