= Lalli Alliance of Finland =

Lalli Alliance of Finland Suomen Lalli-liitto
- Leader: Arvi Kalsta
- Chairman: Niilo Rauvala
- Secretary: Antti Salamaa
- Founded: 1929
- Dissolved: 1930
- Succeeded by: Lapua movement
- Newspaper: Nouseva Suomi
- Ideology: Fascism
- Political position: Far-right

The Lalli Alliance of Finland (Suomen Lalli-liitto) was a Finnish far-right organization founded in 1929. The main themes of the Lalli Alliance were Finnish language nationalism and opposition to communism, parliamentarism and democracy. The aim of the organization was a coup and the appointment of a dictator to lead Finland. The most significant achievement of the organization is considered to be that the Lalli Alliance has been considered to have acted as a precursor to the Lapua movement.

== Establishment ==
The predecessor of the Alliance was the Finnish People's Party, founded in November 1928, whose leaders were Niilo Rauvala, Pertti Uotila and Lennartti Pohjanheimo. Its organ was supported by the magazine Nouseva Suomi (Rising Finland), published by Pohjanheimo. Niilo Rauvala was elected chairman, and Lennartti Pohjanheimo was mainly responsible for financing the organization. The union's secretary and unofficial chief ideologue was sailor Antti Salamaa, who is known, among other things, as an extreme opponent of the Swedish language. During the spring of 1929, Vihtori Kosola and Arvi Kalsta were asked to be the leaders of the Alliance, with Kalsta agreeing.

== Activities ==
The organization spread rumours of a communist coup and planned a march of 12,000 men to Helsinki by August 1929. Its purpose was to suspend the parliament's activities and appoint a dictator to lead the country. Several well-known far-right figures became involved, such as Jäger Lieutenant Antti Isotalo, Jäger Captain Iivari Hyppölä and businessman Rafael Haarla. The fascist revolutionary project was eventually taken so seriously by the country's political leadership that, following a threat of civil servant strike, President Lauri Kristian Relander decided to dissolve parliament, which opposed civil servant pay rises, and hold new elections. A strike by civil servants would also have paralyzed the police and thus enabled a coup.
