= Karhun kansa =

Finnish religious community

Karhun kansa (Finnish: ['kɑrhun ˈkɑnsɑ]) is a religious community based on indigenous Finnish spiritual tradition. The community was officially recognized by the Finnish state in December 2013. "Karhun kansa" is Finnish for "People of the Bear". The bear, known as Otso, is the most sacred animal in the Finnish spiritual tradition, and said to be the mythical ancestor of all humankind. Karhun kansa is part of Suomenusko ("Finnish Faith"), the contemporary revival of pre-Christian polytheistic ethnic religion of the Finns. Some members of Karhun kansa call their faith 'väenusko' rather than 'suomenusko'. The first part of the term 'väenusko' stems from a Finnish word 'väki', which refers to people, and also both unseen and visible powers that are part of traditional Finnic mythology.

== Annual festivities ==
A great many rituals are performed throughout the year by Karhun kansa members, and these may vary from one individual and family to the next. Karhun kansa as a community holds four annual ceremonies:

- Kekri, late October - early November
- Talvennapa ("heart of winter", literally "navel of winter"), mid-January
- Ukonvakka (also Hela or Toukojuhla), during May
- Karhujuhla (or "Bear Celebration" in English), 13 July

Kekri is characterized by great feasting, thanks to the natural bounty provided by the past growing season. Kekri is also time for remembering the departed of one's family, so food offerings are made to the dead and to the familial forebears. Kekri also signifies the end of the year, and beginning of winter. Talvennapa celebrates the passing of midwinter, and it is when the bear is said to "turn its side". The sun wins the darkness, and the days will get longer ever faster. Rituals and songs accompany talvennapa ceremonies, and special lights are lit.

Ukonvakka usually takes place during May, and celebrations mark the beginning of growing season and increasing natural fertility. Rituals are aimed at promoting all kinds of future harvest. A sacred bonfire is lit in the beginning of the ceremonies, and songs are performed, followed by a feast.

The Bear Celebration or the Bear Day has special significance for Karhun kansa community. Bear as a supernatural and holy ancestral being is invited to the feast, and numerous rituals are performed to venerate him, and in order to secure his kindness and future cooperation.

== Other ceremonies ==
Karhun kansa has the right to conduct judicially valid marriage ceremonies. These ceremonies are performed according to the appropriate religious wishes of the couple in question. The community can also perform naming ceremonies, memorial services and funerals.

=== Marriages ===
During 2016 at least one member of the People of The Bear received from the Finnish magistrate's office the right to officiate at marriages. In expectation of the new gender neutral marriage law that will come into effect 1 March 2017, People of The Bear has announced itself ready to marry same sex couples. People of The Bear has said however, that one of the parties willing to get married need to have "a living relationship to Finnish traditional beliefs or Finnic mythology".

== See also ==
- Finnish neopaganism
- Uralic neopaganism
- Neopaganism

== Resources ==
- Bear Ceremonialism in the Northern Hemisphere (A. Irving Hallowell, 1926)
