= August Hyöki =

August Hyöki (10 December 1874 in Luopioinen – 7 October 1960) was a Finnish farmer and politician. He was a member of the Parliament of Finland from 1916 to 1917 and again from June 1918 to March 1919. He represented the Finnish Party until December 1918 and the National Coalition Party from then on.
