= Niilo Rauvala =

Finnish engineer and politician (1883–1956)

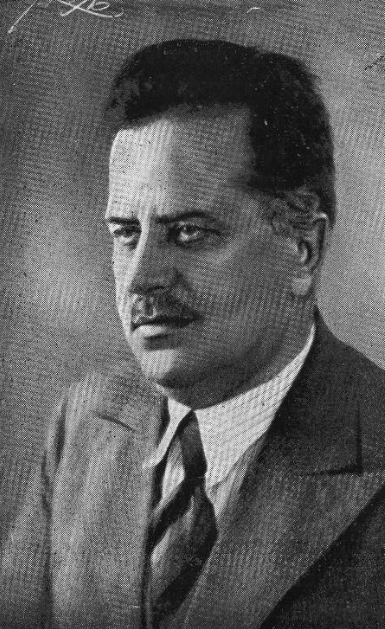

Niilo Vilho Rauvala (15 June 1883 Karkku - 24 April 1956) was a Finnish engineer and the chairman of the far-right Lalli Alliance of Finland and the Nazi Party of Finnish Labor in the 1930s and 1940s.

== Biography ==
Rauvala's parents were farmer Reinhold Rauvala and Selma Junttila. He attended Turku Technical School and graduated as an engineer from Tampere University of Technology in 1915. Rauvala was employed by the State Railways from 1903 to 1915 and after that he worked at Lokomo Oy from 1916 to 1917 and at agricultural shop Hankkija from 1917 to 1921. Rauvala founded the Inventors' Patent Office in 1926 and in 1944 the Finnish Patent Office to continue its operations. He was also the director of Engineer Agency Ltd and since 1935 was member of the executive board of Kullervo-factories. During the war years 1939–1944, Rauvala was employed by the General Staff of the Defense Forces.

In the summer of 1918, Rauvala was elected to a three-member committee that prepared for the establishment of the right-wing socialist Social Democratic Reform Party of Finland. On the basis of the preparations, the Socialist Labor Party was formed in June 1919, and Rauvala was elected to the five-member party committee.

In 1929 Rauvala was elected the chairman of Lalli Alliance of Finland, whose main themes were opposition to communism, parliamentarism and democracy. The organization also spread rumors of a communist coup and planned a march of 12,000 men to Helsinki by August 1929. Its purpose was to suspend the activities of parliament and appoint a dictator to lead the country. A number of well-known far-right figures became involved, such as Jäger Lieutenant Antti Isotalo, Jäger Captain Iivari Hyppölä and businessman Rafael Haarla. The fascist revolutionary project was eventually taken so seriously by the country's political leadership that, following a threat of civil servant strike, President Lauri Kristian Relander decided to dissolve parliament, which opposed civil servant pay rises, and hold new elections. A strike by civil servants would also have paralyzed the police and thus enabled a coup.

Rauvala was the vice-chairman of the Free Workers' Union in the early 1930s and in 1932 he became the chairman of the newly formed Rightist-Workers' and Peasants' Party. This party later used the names Party of Finnish Labor and the New Finnish Party. Rauvala also served as the editor-in-chief of the party's magazine Vapaa Suomi (Free Finland). In 1933, the Party of Finnish Labor published a Finnish edition of the Protocols of the Elders of Zion translated by the party secretary Taavi Vanhanen.

In 1949–1951, Rauvala also had two new parties, the names of which were the Middle Class Party and the Finnish People's Party. The latter party emphasized opposition to Swedish language and its candidate list included professor emeritus Iivari Leiviskä. Former Patriotic People's Movement members were involved in the activities. Later, Rauvala participated in the elections as a candidate for the Finnish People's Party.

Niilo Rauvala married Hellin Laitinen in 1921. They had two children.

Rauvala was a member of the board of the Finnish Theosophical Society.

== Works ==
- Moottorivetäjien käytön kannattavaisuudesta. Keskusosuusliike Hankkija, Helsinki 1920
- Koneet ja maatalous eli satotulokset kaksinkertaisiksi. 1 osa, Maanmuokkauskoneet. Otava 1928
- Suomalaisten keksintöjen merkitys talouselämässämme, eripainos Forum 10. Helsinki 1936
