= Yrjö Ruutu =

Finnish social scientist and politician

Yrjö Oskar Ruutu
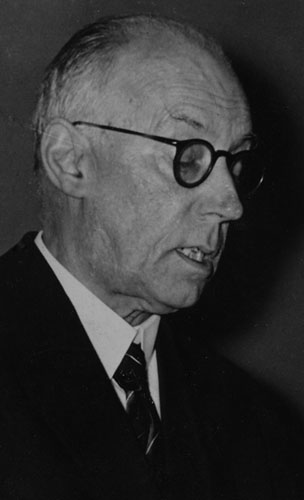
- Born: 26 December 1887; Helsinki, Finland
- Died: 27 August 1956 (aged 68); Helsinki, Finland
- Occupations: Social scientist, politician, political theorist
- Political party: National Socialist Union of Finland; National Coalition Party
- Spouse: Kirsti Antonia Rönnholm (m. 1918)

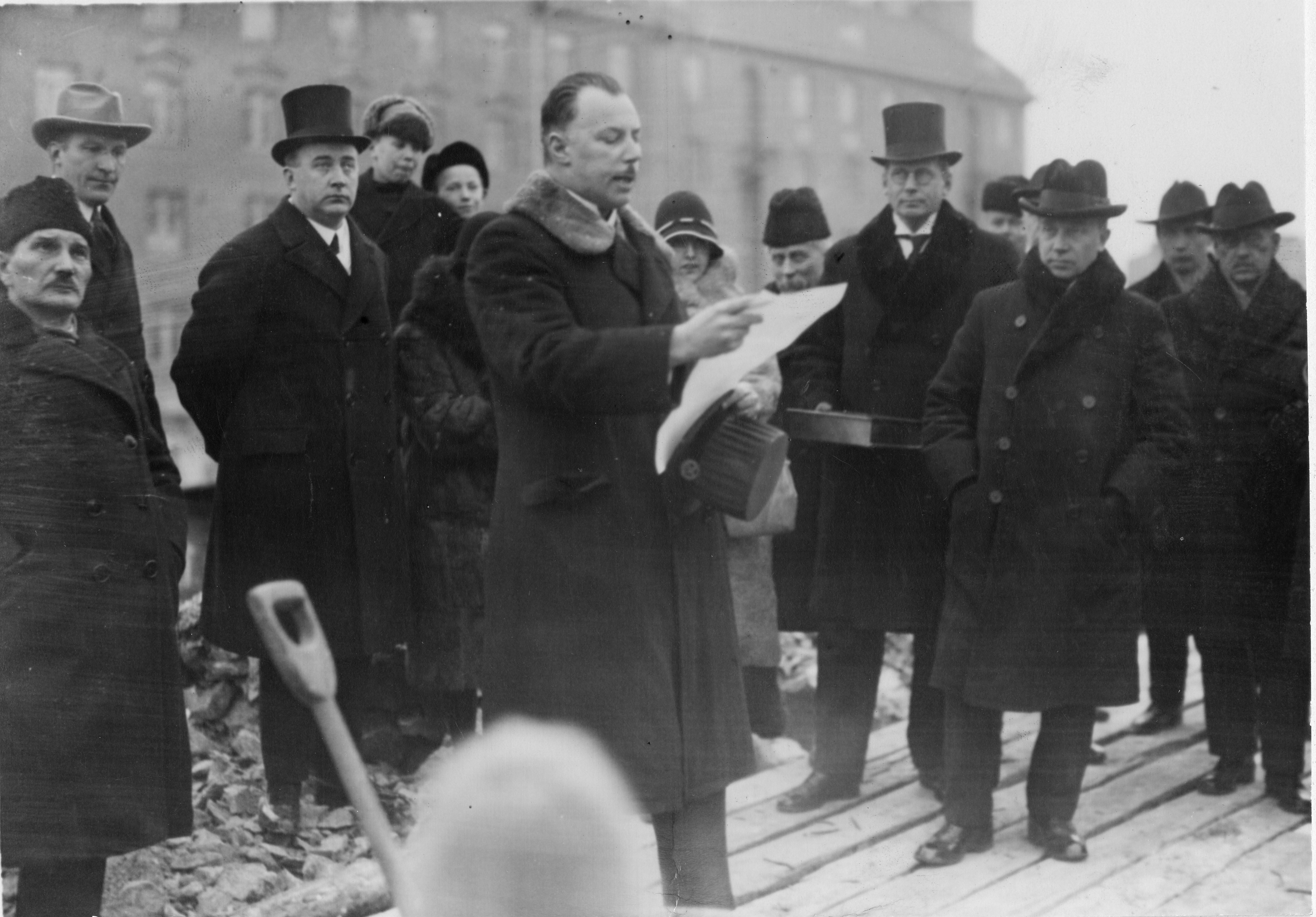
Yrjö Ruutu in 1930

Yrjö Oskar Ruutu (until 1927 Ruuth; 26 December 1887 Helsinki – 27 August 1956 Helsinki) was a Finnish social scientist, politician and political theorist.

Ruutu was the first researcher in international relations in Finland and the first Finn to defend a doctoral thesis in political science. His political career spanned an unusual range: from the Jäger movement and Finnish activism of the 1910s, through nationalist and Finnicization ideology in the 1920s, the founding of the National Socialist Union of Finland in 1932, a public break with Hitler in 1934, and finally membership in the Social Democratic Party of Finland from 1937 and a leading role in the peace opposition during the Continuation War. In August 1944 he submitted the first draft of a Finnish–Soviet defence alliance, which became the starting point for the negotiations that led to the Treaty of Friendship, Cooperation and Mutual Assistance.

Ruutu was principal of the School of Social Sciences (current University of Tampere) 1924–1932, 1935–1945 and 1950–1953 and held a personal professorship in general political science there from 1950 until his retirement in 1953. He was director-general of the National Board of Education 1945–1950.

== Early life and education ==
Yrjö Ruutu was born 26 December 1887 in Helsinki, the son of state archivist and professor Johan Wilhelm Ruuth and Hilja Siviä Tolpo. In 1907 he entered the university and received a Bachelor of Philosophy in 1910 and a PhD in 1922. He studied history, international law, constitutional law and international relations, and was the first scholar in Finland to take up the study of international relations as a discipline.

== Jäger activism (1914–1918) ==
Ruutu was member of the governing body of the Student Union of the University of Helsinki 1912–1915 and its chairman 1913–1915. He was member of a circle of student activists opposing the Russification of Finland. This group was responsible for starting the Jäger movement, and Ruutu was one of the people who organised the founding meeting of the central committee in 1914. According to Pehr Norrmén, Ruutu was the one to suggest funneling volunteers to Germany and organising these veterans to form the revolutionary vanguard in Finland.

Ruutu was an active Jäger recruiter and wrote propaganda leaflets to aid in recruitment. He was arrested by Russian authorities in 1916 and was sent to Shpalernaya Pretrial Detention Prison in Petrograd. He was likely to be executed, but like the rest of the Finnish activist imprisoned there, the authorities never had time to carry out the sentences as the prisoners were released by a mob in 1917. After his release Ruutu had to remain in hiding, since the new Russian authorities also regarded him as a German agent. He moved to Stockholm and then to Berlin, where he worked at Das finnländische Büro, the unofficial representation of the Finnish activists.

Ruutu took part in the civil war in Finland in 1918 on the white side as the adjutant of the commander of the regiment of North Savo. He was awarded the Order of the Cross of Liberty first and second class and the Order of the Cross of Liberty third class with swords.

== Political thought ==
The central theme of Ruutu's political thought was combining socialism and nationalism. In his youth he was one of the most important figures of the Jäger movement and later adopted the view that Finnish independence could best be guaranteed by removing class conflict from society through state socialism. Ruutu was a member of several different parties, from the National Coalition Party to the Finnish People's Democratic League, and led a party of his own. Although "Ruutuite" socialism never became a mass movement, it is considered to have had a considerable influence on the ideology of the Academic Karelia Society and on president Urho Kekkonen.

In 1920 Ruutu published the political pamphlet Uusi Suunta ("New Direction"), which argued for a national form of state socialism — built on the people rather than the class — and for a planned economy as the path to national unity. The book made a deep impression on a generation of younger academic activists, among them Niilo Kärki, Vilho Helanen, Aaro Pakaslahti and Urho Kekkonen.

In 1922 Ruutu defended his doctoral thesis Kansakunta. Poliittinen tutkimus ("The Nation. A Political Study"), the first doctoral dissertation in political science in Finland. He rejected race- and language-based theories of nationhood and argued that Finnish-speakers and Swedish-speakers in Finland constituted two distinct ethnic units that together formed a single nation. In private he advocated an "isolation tactic" toward the Swedish-speaking population, while in public he spoke of "permission to isolate" and of cultural autonomy.

== Impact on the Academic Karelia Society and the language question ==
Although Ruutu's own organizations remained small, his ideas became popular among the broader student politics in the 1920s. Ruutu served for the second time as chairman of the student union in 1922–1923, when language disputes began to re-emerge at the University of Helsinki. After resigning in the middle of the term in the autumn of 1923, Ruutu criticized the new University Act and proposed that Swedish-speaking education and culture in Finland be supported with state funds only in proportion to the Swedish-speaking population. The principle of complete Finnicization of Finnish society as presented by Ruutu later became a key requirement of the so-called "Genuine Finnishness" movement. Ruutu believed that under pressure the Swedish-speaking population would have to adopt "genuine" Finnish culture.

Several supporters of Ruutu rose to influential positions in the Academic Karelia Society. In particular, Niilo Kärki's appointment as AKS's vice-president in 1923 marked the transmission of some of Ruutu's ideas to the AKS program. Ruutu himself was not a member of the AKS, but was a member of the editorial board of its magazine Suomen Heimo. The AKS now stated that it also supported the view expressed in Ruutu's book "The Karelian Question in 1917–1920" (1921) that the future of East Karelia should be decided on the basis of Karelians' own interests and self-government, rather than just seeking territorial conquests for Finland. Despite the adoption of Ruutu's language nationalism, however, the central part of Ruutu's ideology, state socialism, never became part of the AKS program, probably because it was considered too radical. Ruutu was later disappointed with the ideological development of the AKS and left the group when the late 1920s came.

The language disputes in the student world also reiterated the demand for Finnicization of Swedish surnames. Ruutu himself translated his surname from Ruuth to Ruutu in 1927. Ruutu was the original name of his family. Ruutu's AKS supporters Urho Kekkonen and Martti Haavio organized him becoming the chairman of the Association of Finnish Culture and Identity in 1928.

== National Socialist Union of Finland ==
Ruutu founded the National Socialist Union of Finland in 1932 together with Juhani Konkka and was declared its "chief" (analogous to Führer). The party used uniforms, the Roman salute and swastikas. Ruutu was also the first one to introduce the concept of Volksgemeinschaft to the Finnish political lexicon. He was attracted to fascism by the promise of removal of class conflict and an economic theory that put the "national whole" first. Ruutu's interpretation of Nazism was closer to Strasserism. However, this was no obstacle to joining to prominent Finnish orthodox Nazis such as Yrjö Raikas and Ensio Uoti who were in close contact with the Nazi leadership, and party members were later recruited to the Waffen SS.

In the early 1930s Ruutu had viewed German National Socialism favourably and expected the left wing of the movement, led by Gregor Strasser, to prevail. After Hitler came to power in 1933 he began to criticise German policy, and his tone sharpened further after Hitler liquidated the Strasser faction and the SA leadership in 1934. From this point on Ruutu regarded Hitler and Joseph Goebbels as traitors to genuine National Socialism who had sold themselves to big capital. He expelled supporters of German National Socialism from his organization and renamed it "the Finnish socialists" (suomalaissosialistit). After the renamed organization failed to gain traction, its members joined the Social Democratic Party of Finland under Ruutu's leadership in 1937.

== Peace opposition and Finnish–Soviet defence alliance (1942–1944) ==
After the outbreak of the Continuation War, Ruutu was assigned to the war history bureau at general headquarters in Saint Michel. From the turn of 1941–1942 his private notes record his growing recognition that, although Finland was militarily successful, it had tied itself to the side that would lose the war. From the summer of 1942 he took an active part in the peace opposition and played a central role in drafting its most prominent statement, the address of the 33.

In early August 1944 Ruutu submitted to the foreign ministry a draft for a defence alliance between Finland and the Soviet Union. His proposal was the first in a series of similar drafts that eventually resulted in the Treaty of Friendship, Cooperation and Mutual Assistance. Ruutu's aim was that, in exchange for the defence alliance, Finland would recover the territories it had lost in the Winter War. To many contemporaries his trajectory from co-founder of the Jäger movement to architect of a treaty with the Soviet Union seemed incomprehensible, but Ruutu himself regarded it as logical: in the First World War Finland had had everything to gain and nothing to lose, while in the Second it had had little to gain and everything to lose.

== Later academic career ==
In 1945 Ruutu was appointed to a personal professorship in general political science at the newly founded faculty of social sciences at the University of Helsinki, but resigned the same autumn after being appointed director-general of the National Board of Education. He left the Board in 1950 to take up a professorship and the rectorship at the School of Social Sciences in Helsinki (later the University of Tampere), and retired in 1953.

In contrast to his earlier wide-ranging public role, Ruutu became almost completely isolated intellectually as the Cold War in the early 1950s drew new boundaries within both politics and scholarship. Having long worked on international relations and social conflict, he returned to his earliest interests and began writing a treatise on Finland's ancient independence. He died at his desk in the summer of 1956.
