= Aitoo =

- Village
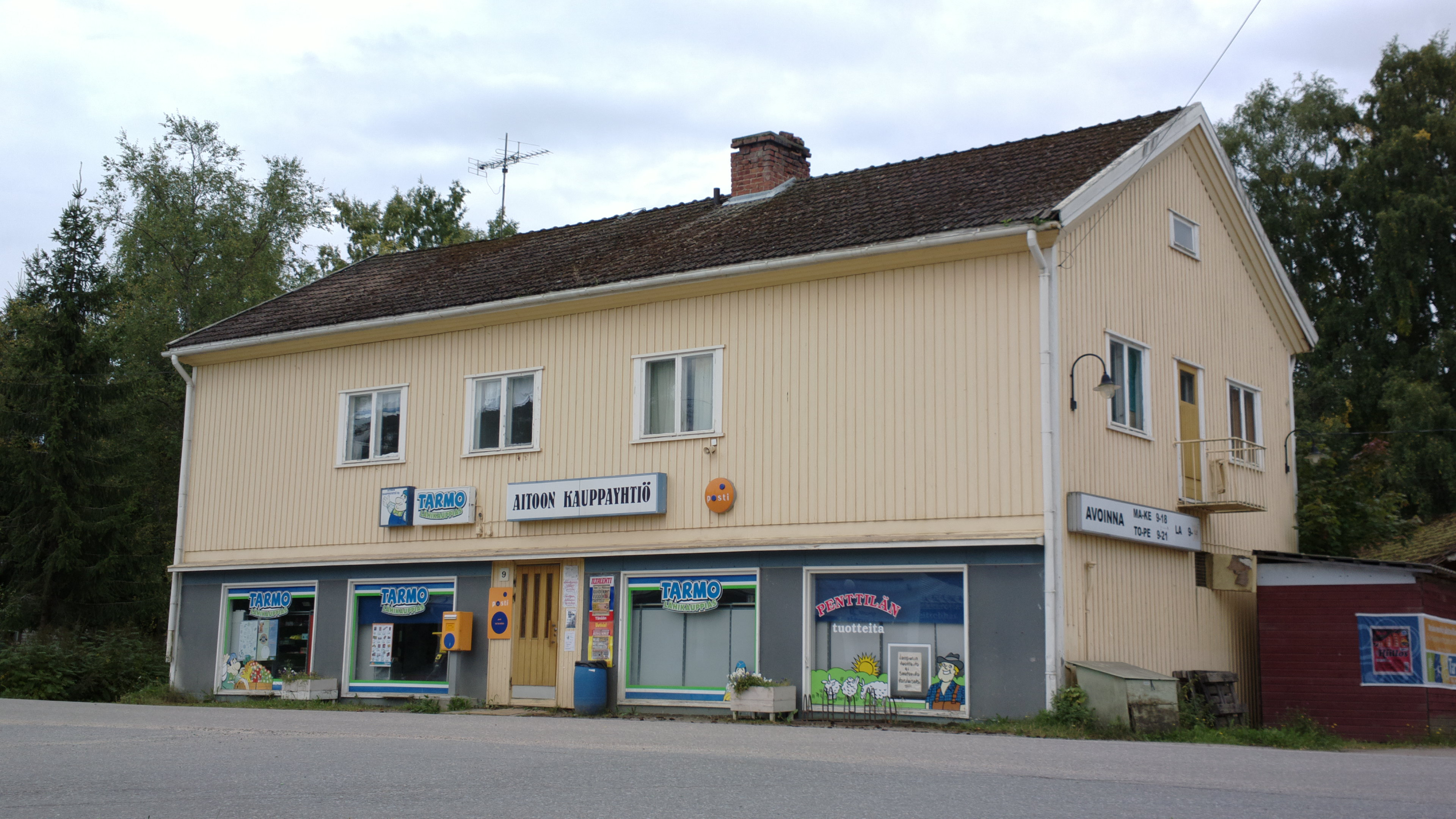
- Tarmo local store in Aitoo.

- Location in Finland
- Coordinates: 61°20′20.306″N 24°29′39.548″E
- Country: Finland
- Region: Pirkanmaa
- Municipality: Pälkäne

Area
  - Total: 2.62 km^{2} (1.01 sq mi)

Population (31 December 2020)
  - Total: 403
  - Density: 1,538/km^{2} (3,980/sq mi)
- Time zone: UTC+2 (EET)
  - Summer (DST): UTC+3 (EEST)
- Postal code: 36720

Aitoo is a village of the Pälkäne municipality in Pirkanmaa, Finland. At the end of 2020, the village had 2,569 inhabitants. Aitoo is located 15 kilometres (9.3 mi) east of Onkkaala, the municipal center of Pälkäne, along the regional road 322.

There is one grocery store and two schools in Aitoo. The village is known for its rock festival called Aitoon Kirkastusjuhlat, which takes place during the summer.

== History ==
Aitoo has existed at least since 1890. Originally Aitoo was not an official village or farm name, but a term referring to the larger community formed by the villages of Kajantila, Miemala and Kouvala.

It was originally a part of the Luopioinen municipality, which was consolidated with Pälkäne in 2007.

=== Name ===
According to Martti Rapola, the name of the village is related to the word aita, "fence". One of his theories is that Aitoo means "villages by the same fence", with the villages in question being Kajantila, Miemala and Kouvala. According to his other theory, the name is derived from the dialectal word aitoo, a Tavastian term meaning "area enclosed with a fence" (standard Finnish aitaus).
