= Onkkaala =

- Village
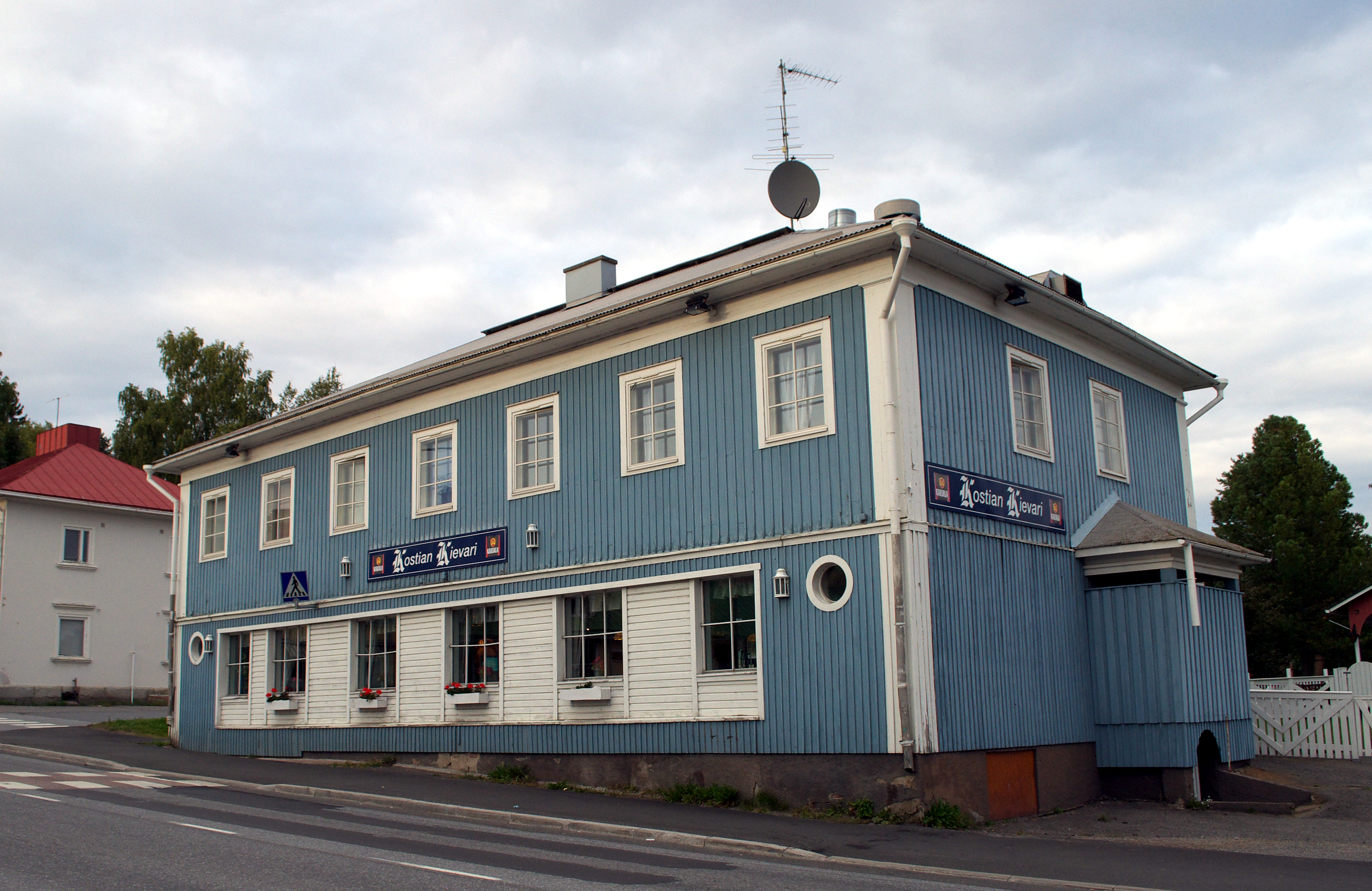
- Kostian Kievari building in Onkkaala.

- Location in Finland Onkkaala (Finland)
- Coordinates: 61°20′20″N 24°16′00″E
- Country: Finland
- Region: Pirkanmaa
- Municipality: Pälkäne

Area
  - Total: 8.26 km^{2} (3.19 sq mi)

Population (31 December 2020)
  - Total: 2,569
  - Density: 3,110/km^{2} (8,100/sq mi)
- Time zone: UTC+2 (EET)
  - Summer (DST): UTC+3 (EEST)
- Postal code: 36600

Onkkaala (formerly known as the Pälkäne church village; Finnish: Pälkäneen kirkonkylä) is a village and the administrative center of the Pälkäne municipality in Pirkanmaa, Finland. At the end of 2020, the village had a population of 2,569. Onkkaala is situated on the isthmus between Lake Pälkänevesi and Lake Mallasvesi, through which the Kostianvirta River flows, connecting the two lakes. Highway 12, linking cities of Tampere and Lahti, passes through Onkkaala.

Many services in Pälkäne are located in Onkkaala, including the municipal office, health center, bus station, library, primary school, high school, fire station, church and parish center. Commercial services include the delivery of the Sydän-Hämeen Lehti newspaper. Onkkaala has a beach sauna for rent on the shores of Lake Mallasvesi, as well as a historical cultural route.

The name of Onkkaala (first recorded as Oncala) appears in documents from 1340, when 25 peasants from the then Sääksmäki parish were excommunicated for failing to pay their taxes. One of the excommunicated peasants was referred to as Ye de Oncala, which can be interpreted as "Yijä of Onkkaala".

== See also ==
- Aitoo

== Sources ==
=== Further reading ===
- Pälkäneen historia, p. 703. Pälkäneen kunta, 1972. ISBN 951-95045-0-8. (in Finnish)
- Pälkäneen historia II, p. 738. Pälkäneen kunta, 1988. ISBN 951-99956-0-9. (in Finnish)
