= Vietti Nykänen =

Finnish architect, writer and politician

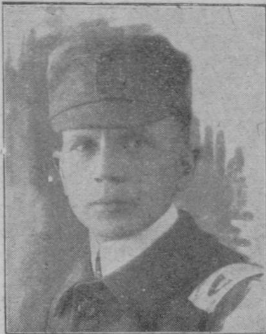

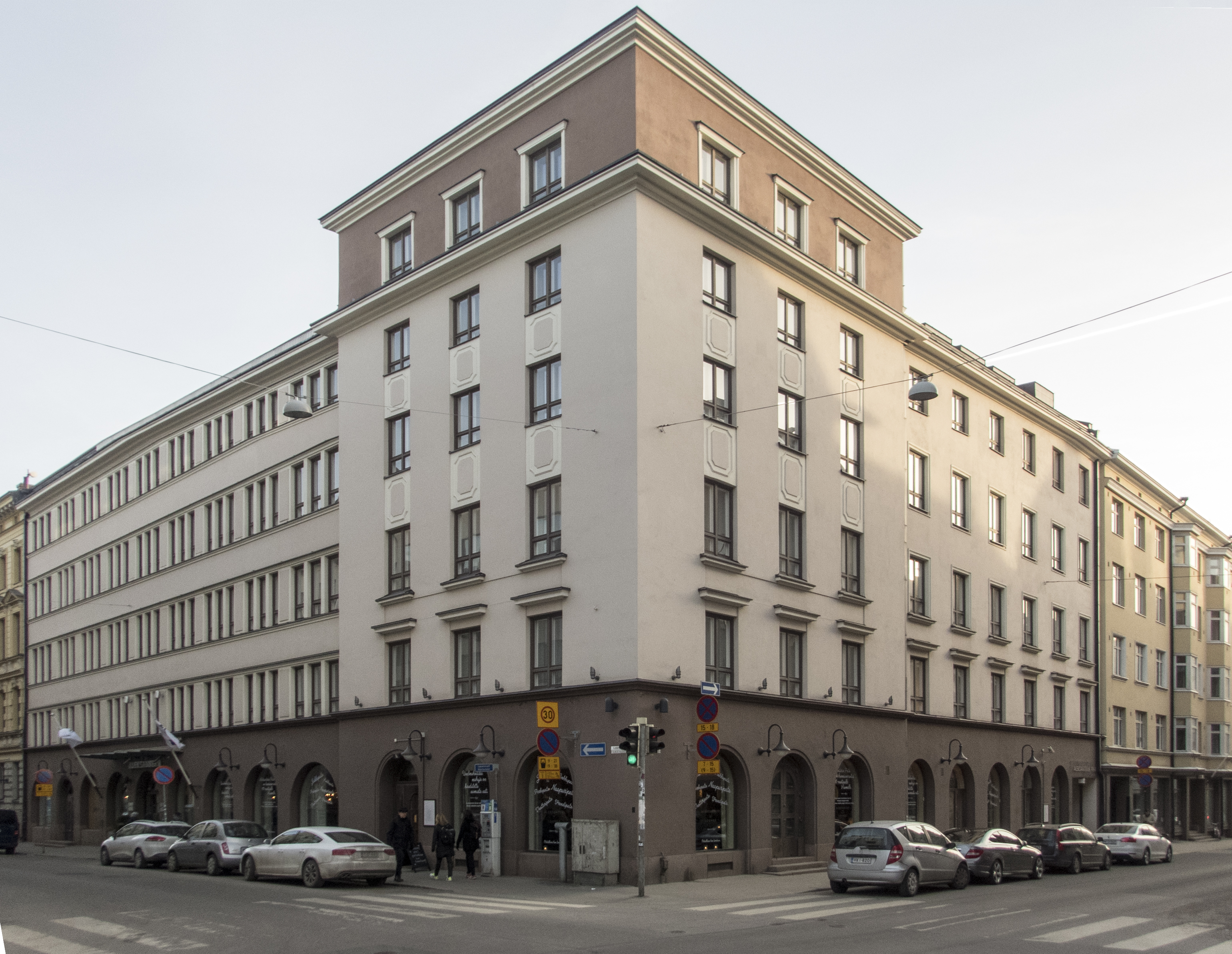
Lönnrotinkatu 26. designed by Vietti Nykänen in 1926.

Vietti Brynolf Nykänen (15 June 1884, St. Petersburg – 6 October 1951) was a Finnish architect, writer and politician.

Nykänen's parents were a goldsmith who owned a workshop in St. Petersburg from 1880 to 1917 and Fabergé's foreman, Gabriel Nykänen (1854–1921), and Henrika (Hinni) Juhanantytär Tuomala Öhberg (1858–1934), who owned a sewing shop in St. Petersburg. Of the nine children, four died young. During the Finnish Civil War, Vietti Nykänen's younger brother, Sulo Nykänen, became known as the "Hangman of Jaala." In 1940, Sulo Nykänen was detained by the Soviets in Estonia. He was convicted of terrorism and counter-revolutionary activities and executed in 1941.

He graduated from the Vyborg Real Lyceum in 1903 and graduated as an architect in 1907. Nykänen worked as an architect and independent builder in Finland, Germany and Russia. At the beginning of the 20th century, Nykänen brought theoretical know-how in reinforced concrete technology to Finland with architect GE Asp and engineer Otto Weyerstall.

Nykänen took part in founding the Vyborg White Guard in January 1918 and served as its chief of staff in the Finnish Civil War. Vietti Nykänen also participated among Finnish volunteers in the Estonian War of Independence, he was also later politically active. In the early 1930s, Nykänen belonged to the National Socialist Union of Finland until he quarreled with the organization and in March 1933, founded a new "Stormers" party. In the autumn of 1933, Chairman Nykänen got into disputes with his party colleagues. The opposition accused Nykänen of autocracy, and disappointed supporters left the party, setting up their organization "Stormtroopers." In 1934, Nykänen joined the ranks of the Patriotic People's Movement. During the Continuation War, he was active in the National Socialists of Finland. In 1948, Nykänen was elected vice-chairman of the Radical People's Party.

In 1938, Nykänen, with Vihtori Herttua and journalist Arvo Kokko, planned a far-right coup, which was to take place on 16 May 1938 in connection with the 20th anniversary parade of the Finnish Civil War. The coup aimed at ousting Cajander's Social Democrat-Agrarian government was to be led by the civil war veteran organisation Front Soldier League, after Carl Lindh, president of the union, had been ousted and "foreign-language and pro-Masonic" forces had been removed from the organisation's board. The planners of the coup project planned for Antti Isotalo to be the new chairman of the union. However, the coup was aborted due to a lack of support from the union.

== Buildings designed by Nykänen ==
- As. Oy Kaarinankatu 2, Turku 1926–1927
- Lönnrotinkatu 26, Helsinki 1929

== Writings ==
- Huonerakennusalalla esiintyvistä tukirakenteista: rakennusteknillinen tutkielma. Helsinki: Rakentajain kustannus oy, 1930.
- Lyhyt rautabetoniopas. Helsinki: Otava, 1913.
- Nykyaikaisia uimahalleja. Helsinki: Akateeminen kirjakauppa, 1926.
- Rautabetoni: pääpiirteinen esitys sen synnystä, ominaisuuksista, teoriiasta ja käytäntötavoista. Helsinki: Otava, 1911.
- Suomen uusi tie. Helsinki: Kustannustoimisto Rivi, 1942.

Under the pseudonym U. Olavi Keso:

- Laukolain juttu. Suomen sotilas, Helsinki, 1928
- Luomme nyt mahtavan, suuren Suomen, Helsinki, 1943
