= Otso =

Finnish mythological bear spirit

- Spirit of bears
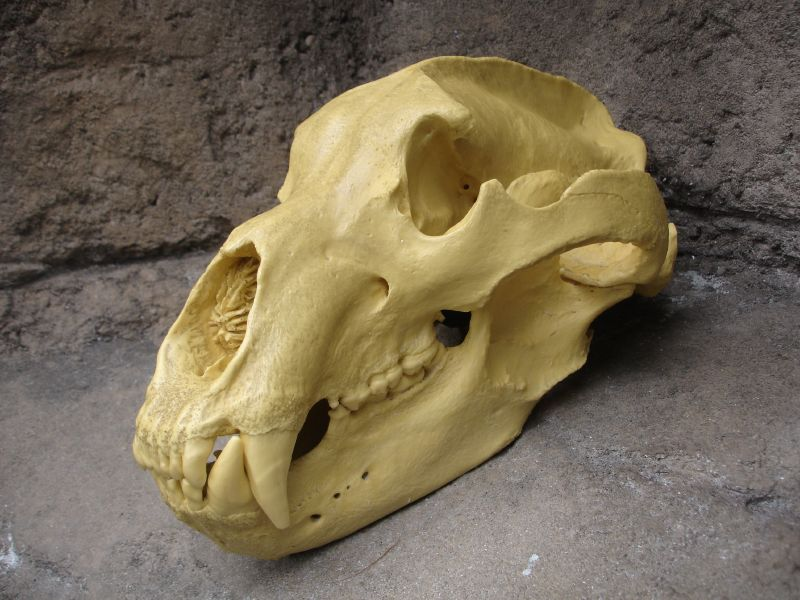
- Bear skulls were venerated by ancient Finns.
- Other names: Karhu; Ohto; Kontio; Metsän kuningas Mesikämmen
- Animals: Bears
- Region: Finland

In Finnish mythology, Otso (also known as Karhu, Ohto, Kontio, Metsän kuningas, and Mesikämmen) is a bear, the sacred king of animals and leader of the forest. It was deeply feared and respected by old Finnish tribes. Otso appears in the Finnish national epic, the Kalevala. Due to the importance of the bear spirit in historical Finnish paganism, bears are still considered by many Finns to be kings of the forest, and the bear is even the national animal of Finland.

Otso is not a particular individual bear spirit, but rather the collective animistic spirit of all bears. Besides being worshipped by historical Finnish pagans, Otso is also worshipped in modern Finnish neopaganism, and the neopagan organization Karhun kansa is named after the bear.

== Mythology ==
The story of how Otso was born varies in myths. Some stories tell of how Ukko, the god of weather, threw wool into the sea and how Otso was born from the bits of wool that reached the shore. Other stories tell of how Otso was born from the Ursa Major constellation.

The most ancient myths surrounding Otso tell of the marriage between Otso and the primordial mother of all men. This relationship was reflected in the ritual of Peijaiset, in which the bear spirit was symbolically returned to its family through marriage.

Otso had many wives and children, but it was also said to eat them.

== Peijaiset ==
If a bear had to be killed by ancient Finns, a sacred ritual of Peijaiset was held. In it, the bear's skull was mounted on a pine tree. The bear was skinned in the forest after which the meat and the hide were taken to the village. Ale was brewed and the meat of the bear was eaten as a sacred meal. A girl and a boy were then elected as the symbolic wedding couple. During the feast, the skull of the bear was carried on a plate to the room. The plate was given a place of honor at head of the long table. The bride and bridegroom sat at the opposite end.

The skull of the bear was then carried to a sacred tall pine and fixed high on a branch among other bear skulls. At this point there followed a chant as a dialogue between the killed bear and the primordial mother of the bear who was called Hongotar.

The bones of the bear were then buried under the pine. One important function of this rite was to prevent the skull from decomposing. The skull of the bear was a holy object and to destroy it was taboo. The idea of this conservation was to make it possible for the spirit of the bear to return to earth to reincarnate and be killed again.

== See also ==
- Bear worship
