= Luopioinen =

Former municipality of Finland, now part of Pälkäne

- Former municipality
- Luopioisten kunta
- Coat of arms

- Location of Luopioinen in Finland
- Coordinates: 61°21′45″N 024°39′25″E
- Country: Finland
- Province: Western Finland Province
- Region: Pirkanmaa
- Established: 1880
- Merged into Pälkäne: 2007
- Seat: Luopioisten kirkonkylä

Area
  - Land: 392.12 km^{2} (151.40 sq mi)

Population (2006-12-31)
  - Total: 2,392

Luopioinen is a former municipality of Finland, situated about 60 kilometres (40 mi) from Tampere. It is part of the Pirkanmaa region and in 2007 it was joined to the municipality of Pälkäne. It is a rural town containing a few lakes, most famous being lake Kukkia.

== History ==
Luopioinen was established during the Middle Ages, though the exact date is unclear. It remained a small village until 1693 when it acquired a chapel. At this time, Luopioinen was a part of the Hauho parish and was also known as Vesikansa. It became an independent parish in 1880, by then the alternative name Vesikansa had fallen out of use.

Aitoo was first mentioned in 1890.

Luopioinen was consolidated with Pälkäne in 2007.

=== Name ===
The name of Luopioinen comes from either a dialectal noun luopa meaning a narrow strait or from the verb luoda. It is unrelated to the word luopio meaning "apostate".

== Statistics ==
- Established in 1868
- Population 2,372 (as of December 31, 2003)
- Age distribution
  - 0–14 yrs 14.9%
  - 15–64 yrs 57.1%
  - 65– yrs 28.0%
- Total area 391.8 km^{2}, of which 74.3 km^{2} are lakes
- Income tax percentage 18.50%
- Unemployment rate 9.3% (as of 2002)

== People born in Luopioinen ==
- August Hyöki (1874–1960)
