= Juhani Konkka =

Finnish politician and journalist

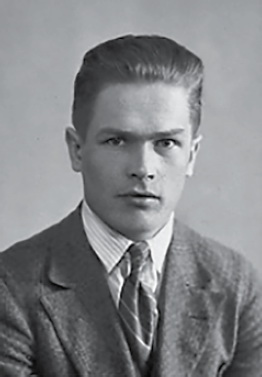
- Juhani Konkka in 1931
- Born: September 4, 1904; Konkkala, Saint Petersburg Governorate
- Died: June 22, 1970 (aged 65); Kuhmoinen, Finland
- Occupations: Writer, Translator, Screenwriter, Politician

Juhani Konkka (September 4, 1904 – June 22, 1970) was an Ingrian Finnish writer, translator, screenwriter and politician.

== Biography ==
Juhani Konkka was born in the village of Konkkala near the village of Toksovo in the Shlisselburg district of St. Petersburg Governorate (now the Vsevolozhsky District of the Leningrad region) into a wealthy Ingerian family. His father, Simo Konkka, was the head of the village, was elected justice of the peace, and his mother was Katri Vanhanen. There were twelve children in the family, five of whom died in infancy. His father encouraged reading in his large family, and thanks to him there were always many books in the house – from the Bible to Jean-Jacques Rousseau.

Konkka began writing poetry in Finnish at the age of eight. He graduated from elementary school in his village of Konkkala. In the autumn of 1917 he entered one of the Petrograd lyceums, then continued his education at the Petrograd Agricultural School. However, he did not graduate, as after the arrest of his father by the Bolsheviks for not informing on his son from a previous marriage who fled to Finland and his subsequent own fleeing to Finland, the whole household and the care of the family became the responsibility of the teenage Konkka, as the eldest of men.

In the autumn of 1919, Konkka's mother was also arrested by the Bolsheviks and taken to Petrograd as a hostage until her husband returned. That same fall, two Finnish communists took ownership of Konkka's house. His father then returned illegally to the USSR, but was forced to hide in an artillery range until Konkka managed to break his mother out from prison. Immediately after, the Konkka family went to Finland on forest trails.

This four-day journey with small children in his arms, during which the family's lives were in mortal danger, is described in detail in Konkka's autobiographical novel Pietarin valot (The Lights of St. Petersburg). Arriving in Finland, 15-year-old Konkka immediately volunteered for the army of the North Ingria, commanded by Georg Elfvengren. The regiment was stationed in Kirjasalo – the capital of the unrecognized republic of North Ingria. At this time, his parents and other children were trying to settle in Finland in the area of Rautu, where about three thousand refugees from North Ingria gathered.

After the conclusion of the Tartu Peace Treaty in October 1920, the Moscow Bolshevik leadership promised all Ingerians amnesty and the right to return to their homes.

In early June 1921, the Konkka family returned home, but without Juhani. He decided to stay in Finland and continue his education. Konkka first studied at the Impilahti Kansakoulu, and then entered the Sortavala Teachers' Seminary.

In early 1922 he participated as a volunteer in the East Karelian Uprising and in the battle of Porosozero was seriously wounded in the thigh. After several months at Sortavala Hospital, his right leg became a few inches shorter than his left, and Konkka was declared unfit for military service.

On Christmas 1923, Konkka illegally crossed the Soviet border to spend a few days with his family. However, by this time his two younger sisters and brother had become active members of the Komsomol and the reception was hostile. This was the last time Konkka saw his home and his parents. In 1931, his father and mother with the children, Urho and Unelma, were deported to Siberia. The Konkka family's old house was sold for firewood, and the new one was moved to Toksovo and turned into a printing house. The older children became members of the Communist Party. After two years of exile, mothers and children were allowed to return from Siberia, but were forbidden from returning to Ingria and had to move to Karelia. His father, on the other hand, was exiled from Western Siberia even further, to northeastern Yakutia, where he died in 1933.

On his way back from the USSR to Finland, Finnish border guards detained him on suspicion of espionage. In 1924, Konkka was released. He moved to Helsinki and entered the Higher School of Journalism (Finnish: Sanomalehtitutkinto Yhteiskunnallinen korkeakoulu). Konkka paid for his studies at the institute, working as a mercenary, timber floater and lumberjack in the summer. In 1927 he graduated from the institute and received a degree in journalism.

In 1929, his first novel, Me sankarit, was published under the pseudonym Urho Torikka. In this novel, he satirically described the events of the civil war in Karelia and his participation in it, receiving from critics the epithet "Finnish Remarque".

In 1932 Konkka founded the National Socialist Union of Finland together with Yrjö Ruutu. Konkka was the party secretary of the NSUF (1933–1934) and the editor-in-chief of the party newspaper The National Socialist. Konkka was politically even more extreme than Ruutu.

In 1943, the autobiographical novel Kulkurin kesä (Summer of the Tramp) was published, which became a Finnish bestseller and was reprinted several times. A series of autobiographical novels of the time also included Kulkurin kahleet (The Shackles of the Tramp, 1945), Kulkurin koulut (The Schools of the Tramp, 1946), and Kulkurin vaellus (The Wanderings of the Tramp, 1947).

In 1958, as part of a delegation of Finnish writers, Konkka visited Moscow, Samarkand and St. Petersburg. While in St. Petersburg, he came to Toksovo hoping to visit the place where his native village was, but he was not allowed to the landfill. The same year, he published his most famous, autobiographical novel Pietarin valot (The Lights of St. Petersburg), about his childhood and youth in the revolutionary Russian Empire.

Besides literary work, Konkka worked as an editor in the publishing house WSOY from 1937 to 1944 and 1950 to 1955 respectively.

From 1949 to 1958 he was a member of the board of the Union of Finnish Writers.

Konkka was involved in many translations of Russian classics, including Nikolai Gogol, Fyodor Dostoevsky, Leo Tolstoy, Anton Chekhov, Maxim Gorky, Boris Pasternak, Mikhail Sholokhov and others. In total, he translated more than a hundred books by Russian writers into Finnish, for which in 1967 he received a prize for translators in the USSR.

Having received the prize, Konkka went to Petrozavodsk to visit his relatives, whom he had not seen for more than forty years, and distributed money to his relatives. Karelian writers considered him a traitor and a fascist and refused to meet with him.

Juhani Konkka died on June 22, 1970 at his dacha in the town of Kuhmoinen in Central Finland.

He had three children: Anita, Urho and Heikki.

== Awards ==
- Mikael Agricola Award, 1961
- Title of Master Translator, Moscow, 1967
