= Ensio Uoti =

Finnish politician

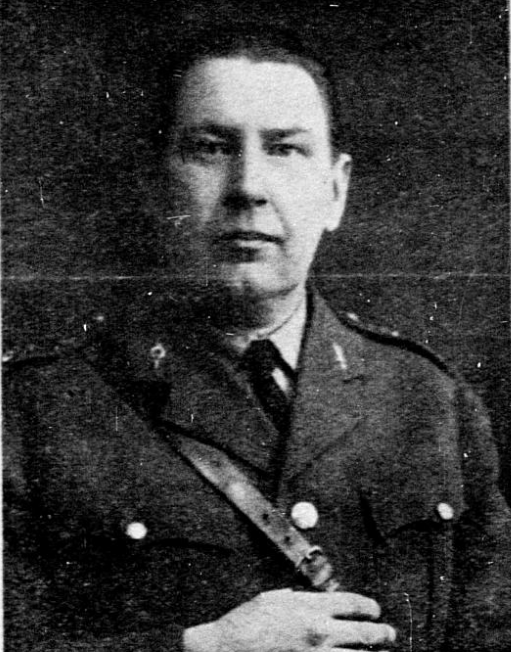
Ensio Uoti

Ensio Ilmari Uoti (5 September 1897 Pori – 1966 Aachen) was a Finnish far-right politician who was the leader of the Finnish-Socialist Workers' Party (SSTP).

== Life ==
Ensio Uoti's parents were pastor Juho Henrik Uoti, a known anarchist, and Augusta Matilda Laurila (1863–1936), a primary school teacher. Uoti took part in many battles in the Finnish Civil War and joined the German army in 1918. In 1919, he moved to Germany to study engineering, after which Uoti visited Finland only occasionally. Uoti graduated as Master of Science in 1924 from Aachen University of Technology metallurgy department and subsequently worked in the Finnish Army as an engineer officer. Uoti had met Gottfried Feder, a Nazi economic theorist in Germany who greatly influenced his thinking. According to Uoti, the role of the state in economic life should be strengthened to eliminate the influence of “foreigner groups” associated with capitalism, especially Jews.

In the 1930s, Uoti was active in multiple Finnish Nazi parties, the National Socialist Union of Finland, the Patriotic People's Movement and the Finnish People's Organisation. After this, Uoti co-founded the Finnish-Socialist Workers' Party in November 1934.

The SSTP participated in the 1936 parliamentary elections in the Uusimaa constituency with the slogan "better pay for work". Cars equipped with party election advertisements toured Helsinki, attracting attention thanks to the large swastika banners. The SSTP was abolished after the Continuation War under Article 21 of the Ceasefire Agreement (which entered into force on 23 September 1944) on 12 October 1944.

In the autumn of 1939, Uoti was sent to Berlin on a diplomatic mission. According to his own account, Uoti got to meet Heinrich Himmler, who would have said that Germany would not allow the occupation of Finland and that in two years' time Germany and the Soviet Union would be at war. According to Uoti, Germany would have offered to send a relief mission of 100,000 men to Finland as early as January 1940 via Åland if the Finnish government were to become "German-friendly". During the trip, however, Uoti defended his dissertation on Finnish monetary and fiscal policy in Berlin, and after returning to Finland in February 1940, he reported on his trip to Foreign Minister Väinö Tanner. After the Winter War, Uoti was sentenced to six months in prison for official misconduct, and was on Valpo's watchlist as a suspected spy.

Uoti was a presidential candidate in 1956 elections. He gained some support and was endorsed by Yleisö newspaper.

Uoti was raised as a Lutheran but for him race came before religion. He supported Finnish neopaganism and worship of Ukko which alienated him from the Christian fascist Patriotic People's Movement. He nevertheless considered Jesus an "aryan".

== Works ==
- Kansan työ. Suomalaissosialistisia julkaisuja N:o 1. Suomalaissosialistinen työväen puolue, Helsinki 1935
- Kansan valta. Suomalaissosialistisia julkaisuja N:o 2. Suomalaissosialistinen työväen puolue, Helsinki 1935
- Die Geld- und Finanzpolitik Finnlands nach Erlangung der Selbstständigkeit nebst einem Exkurs über die Wohnbautätigkeit in den Städten : ein Beitrag zur Kritik der liberalen Wirtschaftspolitik; dissertation (Universität Berlin, Fakultät der Staatswissenschaftlichen). Rudolf Bau, Berlin 1940
- Näin tahtoi valtiomies – Tämän saivat aikaan diletantit: suomalaisessa kansallissosialistisessa kentässä mukana olleen toimijan ”testamentti”. Tekijä, Helsinki 1955
