= Finnish-Socialist Workers' Party =

Finnish-Socialist Workers' Party Suomalaissosialistinen Työväen Puolue
- Leader: Ensio Uoti
- Founded: 1934; 92 years ago
- Dissolved: 1944; 82 years ago
- Ideology: Nazism
- Political position: Far-right
- Religion: Finnish neopaganism, Lutheranism

Party flag
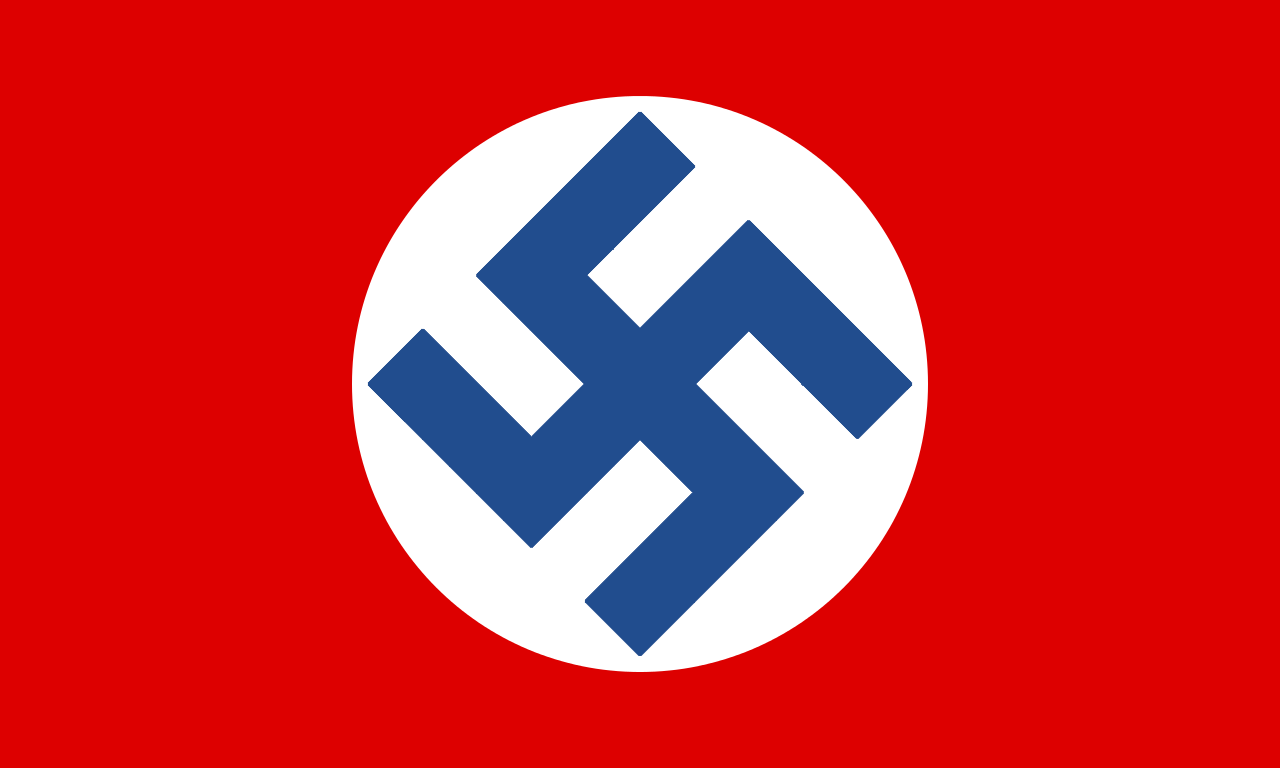

The Finnish-Socialist Workers' Party (Finnish: Suomalaissosialistinen Työväen Puolue, SSTP) was a Finnish Nazi party that operated from 1934 to 1944 and was led by engineer Ensio Uoti.

== The party program ==
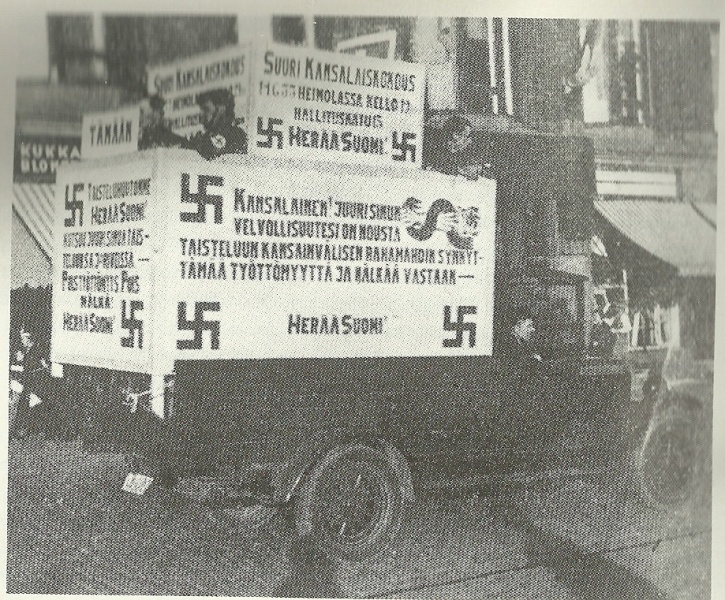
Finnish-Socialist Workers' Party campaign truck

In its program, the party stated that its core goal was to rebuild Finland as a "truly free nation state in the Finnish spirit". The central idea of Finnish socialism was that the state should take a strong role in banking and lending, but otherwise it should not interfere more in the economy.

The party took a strict racial policy position, demanding the removal of all non-Finns from responsible positions. According to the party, civil rights should be reserved only for Finns. The SSTP in particular opposed Jews, but also Finland Swedes. Hostility towards Swedish-speakers distinguished SSTP from the bilingual Finnish People's Organisation.

In addition, the SSTP demanded, among other things, censorship of publications that violate the values of the Finnish people and the centralization of administration to the head of state. The program was inspired by the program of the National Socialist German Workers' Party. Uoti had connections with the Germans and made trips to Germany to meet the Nazi leadership. To the Germans, he presented himself as the most loyal Finnish National Socialist. The SSTP logo had a blue swastika and the text SS.TP.

== Elections ==
The SSTP participated in the 1936 parliamentary elections in the Uusimaa constituency with the slogan "better pay for work". Cars equipped with party election advertisements toured Helsinki, attracting attention thanks to the large swastika banners.

== Religion ==
Uoti supported Finnish neopaganism and worship of Ukko which caused disagreement with the Christian fascist Patriotic People's Movement. Uoti's father was a priest and he had had a Christian upbringing, but supported Christianity only insofar it could be harnessed to attack the Jews. Uoti nevertheless viewed Jesus as an "aryan", not a Jew. Regardless of Uoti's less than enthusiastic position on Christianity, SSTP still had active members of the Lutheran congregation as members.

== Banning ==
The SSTP was abolished after the Continuation War under Article 21 of the Moscow Armistice banning all fascist parties (which entered into force on 23 September 1944) on 12 October 1944.

== Sources ==
- Henrik Ekberg (1991). Führerns trogna följeslagare. Den finländska nazismen 1932–1944. Schildts. 951-50-0522-1.
