= Teo Snellman =

Finnish politician

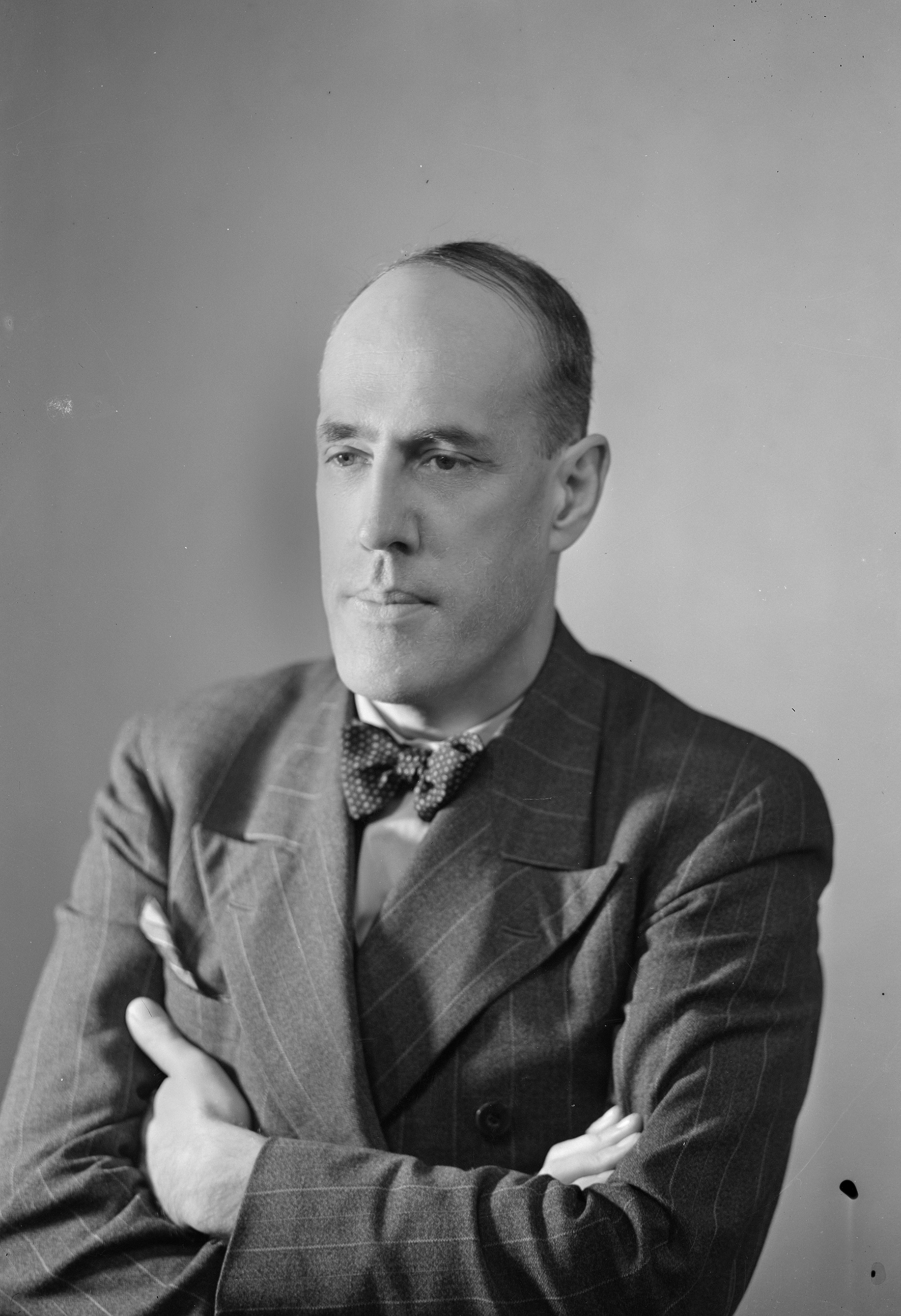
- Snellman in 1938

Leader of the Finnish National Socialist Labor Organisation
- In office November 8, 1940 – September 23, 1944
- Preceded by: Office established
- Succeeded by: Office abolished

Personal details
- Born: 28 April 1894 Tampere, Grand Duchy of Finland, Russian Empire
- Died: 14 October 1977 (aged 83) Helsinki, Finland
- Party: Finnish National Socialist Labor Organisation
- Spouse: Elsa Snellman
- Children: Klaus Snellman
- Parent: Karl Snellman
- Relatives: Johan Vilhelm Snellman (grandfather); Laila Snellman (granddaughter)
- Occupation: Politician, embassy counselor, translator

Teo Kaarlo Snellman (April 28, 1894 – October 14, 1977) was a Finnish Nazi, embassy counselor, translator, and vegetarian. From 1940 to 1944, Snellman headed the Finnish National Socialist Labor Organisation. Snellman was the grandson of Johan Vilhelm Snellman. Teo considered his grandfather Johan Vilhelm and Eino Leino, Väinämöinen and Mikael Agricola to be Finland's first National Socialists.

Teo Snellman's father was Karl Snellman, general manager of the Road and Water Works Institute. Teo Snellman enrolled as a student in 1912 and graduated with a master's degree in philosophy in 1919. In the 1920s and 1930s, Teo Snellman made a career in diplomatic missions in Argentina, Estonia, and Sweden.

After the so-called Stockholm incident of 1933–1934, Snellman had to resign. He refused to leave Stockholm within the time limit set by the Ministry. Ambassador Rafael Erich accused his subordinates of contributing to an article edited by Margit Millén and defaming the ambassador in two southern Swedish newspapers. The incident attracted attention in both countries and was also discussed in Parliament. Snellman considered himself innocent, blamed Jews for his fate and began writing for the far right in Finland. He became interested in Nazism and co-operated with, among others, the Finnish-Socialist Workers' Party. After the end of the Continuation War, due to Nazi connections, he was exiled with some others to the countryside by order of the Minister of the Interior Kaarlo Hillilä.

Teo Snellman was a pioneer of healthy eating and vegetarianism in Finland, according to Panu Rajala, "perhaps under the influence of his role model Hitler". In particular, he supported the Waerland nutrition doctrine created by Are Waerland. Snellman wrote several books on politics, anti-Semitism, Holocaust denial, and healthy lifestyles.

Snellman was married to the painter Elsa Snellman. His son Klaus Snellman was also a diplomat, and served as ambassador to Lima, Manila, and Sofia. Teo Snellman was the grandfather of Laila Snellman, director of a model agency.

== Works ==
- Ulkokansalaistoiminta ja siirtolaisten huolto. I–II. Suomi-seura, 1929
- Erich, Maydel ja Tukholman selkkaus, 1936
- Ahvenanmaan kysymys ja Suomi-Ruotsi ongelma, 1939
- Suomalainen ihanneravinto: Laktovegetaarinen keittokirja. 4. rev. p., 1977
- Paastoamalla terveeksi, 1979
- Parantava paasto: paasto parannuskeinojen kuningas, 1988
