= Peace opposition =

Finnish cross-party movement

Peace opposition (Finnish: rauhanoppositio, Swedish: fredsoppositionen) was a Finnish cross-party movement pushing for Finland to step out of the Continuation War (1941 to 1944). From 1943 to 1944, the "Peace opposition" united bourgeois politicians such as Paasikivi, Kekkonen and Sakari Tuomioja with social democrats, wanted a way to conclude peace with the Soviet Union. The number of MPs belonging to this group was rather small at first, but it gained influence as the military situation worsened. After the signing of armistice, Paasikivi established his cabinet, which included members of the previous opposition group.

== Background ==
Paasikivi, the leading statesman of the group had concluded by 1943 that Germany was going to lose the war and Finland was in great danger. However, his initial opposition to the pro-German line was too well known, and his first initiatives for peace negotiations were met with little support both from Field Marshal Mannerheim and Risto Ryti, who was the war-time President. Negotiations were conducted intermittently in 1943–44 between Finland and its representative Juho Kusti Paasikivi on the one side, and the Western Allies and the Soviet Union on the other, but no agreement was reached.

However, by autumn 1944, the need for peace was becoming more evident: Mannerheim had repeatedly reminded the Germans that in case their troops in Estonia retreated, Finland would be forced to make peace even at very unfavourable terms. Soviet-occupied Estonia would have provided a favourable base for amphibious invasions and air attacks against Finnish cities, and would have strangled Finnish access to the sea. When the Germans indeed did withdraw, the Finnish desire to end the war increased.

President Risto Ryti resigned, and Finland's military leader and national hero, Carl Gustaf Emil Mannerheim, was extraordinarily appointed president by the parliament, accepting responsibility for ending the war.

On September 4, 1944, the cease-fire ended military actions. An armistice was signed in Moscow on September 19 between the Soviet Union and Finland. Finland had to make many limiting concessions. Immediately after the ceasefire, Mannerheim appointed Paasikivi, so far leader of the Peace opposition, as the Prime Minister.

For the first time in Finland a Communist, Yrjö Leino, was included in the Cabinet. Paasikivi's policies were radically different than those of the previous 25 years. His main effort was to prove that both parties would gain from confident peaceful relations. He had to comply with many Soviet demands, including the War Crimes trial, which sentenced leading politicians (at the time of the Continuation war) into jail. When Mannerheim resigned, parliament selected Paasikivi as the succeeding president.
