= Radical People's Party (Finland) =

Defunct political party in Finland

Radical People's Party Radikaalinen Kansanpuolue
- Founded: November 11, 1944
- Dissolved: end of the 1950s
- Newspaper: Totuuden Torvi
- Ideology: Radicalism; Populism; Socialism
- Political position: Left-wing

Radical People's Party (Finnish: Radikaalinen Kansanpuolue) was a Finnish radical populist socialist political party led by Ernesti Hentunen. The party was active in the 1940s and 1950s. The Radicals participated three times in the parliamentary elections and once in the municipal elections. They were left without MPs, but Hentunen served in the Helsinki City Council in 1948–1950. The party paper was Totuuden Torvi ("Horn of Truth").

== History ==
=== Founding ===
The Radical People's Party was founded after the end of the Continuation War as Ernesti Hentunen began arranging a new political organization. Hentunen had been imprisoned and under house arrest during the war years due to his political beliefs. After the Moscow Armistice came into force, he was once again able to express his radical and critical positions. The new party began to advertise in the press in October, and held its inaugural meeting on 11 November 1944. Hentunen was elected chairman and Lennart Mäkelä vice chairman. With the exception of Hentunen the founders were quite unknown. The organization was accepted to the association registry on 27 November.

In December 1944 the party declared itself a socialist organisation. The Radicals said they stood between the social democrats and the communists on the political spectrum. Hentunen considered the French Radical Party and Léon Blum as his models. In late 1944, the party began to expand its operations from Helsinki. Sections of Tampere and Turku were established in December and January while ten other municipalities soon followed. The first issue of the party organ Totuuden Torvi was published in January.

=== Upswing ===
Radical People's Party took part in the March 1945 parliamentary elections with no success, but the failed effort did not discourage the activists. Hentunen stayed in the public eye thanks to his many lawsuits aimed at the establishment. Events organized by the party drew large crowds. The party introduced a logo, which contained an X-shaped cross on a yellow background.

The party offered cooperation to the extreme left, but it was rejected. For example, in the autumn 1945 the radicals sent congratulations to the Communist Party of Finland (SKP) for its 27th anniversary. At this stage, the radical party was very pro-Soviet Union and it thought that it was possible to oust the hated rulers with the help of USSR. The party wanted to abolish "fascist" newspapers (such as Uusi Suomi, Helsingin Sanomat, Turun Sanomat and Hufvudstadsbladet). It was not satisfied with the lenient court decisions of the war-responsibility trials.

The Radical People's Party changed its attitude of the Communists and the Soviet Union very quickly when Hentunen noticed that his thoughts got no sympathy from the far left. The party turned into a sharp opposition of the Popular Front approach adopted by the government, which included the communists, social democrats, liberals and centre. It began to attack the Communist Party and other organisations led by communists. In November 1946, the party organised an event at the anniversary of the October Revolution in Helsinki and, in his speech, Hentunen mainly criticized the USSR. The party's Foreign Policy Agenda (1947) called for the return or independence of Karelia which was lost in the war. The party permanently displayed on the matter, which irritated the authorities who were trying to please the Allied Control Commission.

On 22 August 1947, the Radical People's Party was going to organise a speech event at the Helsinki Railway Square. The event was set up because the party newspaper was abolished by the state. The state police Valpo and the Ministry of the Interior, however, decided to intervene, and the government ordered to take Hentunen in preventive detention. The speaker, on the other hand, fell ill, and could not arrive at the square where thousands of eager listeners had gathered. Riots started when police tried to break up the disappointed crowd. The protesters then moved to Hentunen's apartment where the fight continued for over an hour. The authorities finally got the situation under control by taking up arms. Hentunen was exported to a secure facility for one and a half months. Around the same time the authorities discussed the abolition of the organization: first, in July, and again in September, when the party was intended to be prohibited (alongside the National Coalition Party's youth league) on the basis of the 1944 armistice agreement. However, both projects broke down, and Hentunen was released from custody after the State of emergency laws expired. The hardships of Hentunen became a popular issue on the Finnish press and the radical party received media attention throughout Europe.

In the December 1947 municipal elections Hentunen rose to the Helsinki city council. The radicals had become famous for the scandals involving the party, especially the actions of "red" Valpo. In November, the party's speech event at the Exhibition Hall attracted more than 6,000 listeners. Hentunen's peculiar motions were not supported by the council, and other groups did not engage themselves in debates with the man. Hentunen did not even manage to get initiatives to votes, and his interest in the activities of the council faded. The party did not participate in the following municipal elections three years later.

Radical People's Party opposed the Finno-Soviet Treaty of 1948 (YYA) of 1948 between Finland and Soviet Union. On 7 March 1948, the party organized an anti-Finno-Soviet Treaty event which gathered 3,000 participants. Hentunen was able to speak for about 20 minutes before the Communist shock troops interrupted and closed down the demonstration. Hentunen was forced to leave the scene in police protection. The Communists were later cited in court. In April 1948, the SKP-led Finnish People's Democratic League (SKDL) made a parliamentary query of the radical's activities, which it described as an example of abuse of freedom of expression.

=== Internal schisms ===
Radical People's Party revised its leadership in 1947 and 1948. The purpose was to get more active people to help Hentunen. Olavi Avokari was made vice-chairman in 1947, but he was succeeded by Leo Lehtonen in April 1948. Jaakko Kaponen was elected as the party secretary. Changes, however, led to conflicts between Hentunen and the others. In the March annual meeting, Kaponen made an initiative to establish a new, more serious-minded, newspaper which would replace Totuuden Torvi. The proposal received majority support but was opposed sharply by Hentunen. Two weeks later, the board decided to establish a commission to improve the magazine. Hentunen was not elected to the body and the party committee was given the power to establish a new party magazine. After this decision, the relations of Hentunen and the majority broke down completely. The two factions no longer met at the same meetings.

On 14 May the board held a meeting in which the chairman (who was not present) was discharged from for having exceeded his authority. Toivo Avokari took over the chairmanship. The board also decided to begin publishing a new party paper called Radikaali (Radical). Toivo Liljeqvist was chosen the editor-in-chief. Radikaali was published from May to July. Compared with Totuuden Torvi, Radikaali had a significantly different journalist line. Instead of the populist tabloid style, the Radikaali sought to be a serious political organ. The journal outlined that the Radical People's Party was a centrist group fighting against the extremes. The Radikaali emphasized the confidential relationship between Finland and Soviet Union, and it did not agitate against the USSR.

Hentunen did not accept his ousting and he went on the attack. He appealed to court to invalidate the decisions of the annual meeting and convened an extraordinary party congress on 16 May. The event was held at Hentunen's home and it gathered around 40 participants who were all Hentunen supporters. Board members also tried to arrive, but they were not allowed inside. The meeting expelled the competitors from the party. In case of loss in the court, the meeting also set up a new association, Riippumaton Radikaalinen Puolue (Independent Radical Party).

The 1948 election took place in early July, but the infighting halted the chances of radical progress. Two radical parties participated in the elections and the success was low. Later in July the District Court of Helsinki declared the March annual meeting invalid due to errors in some minor technicalities. The anti-Hentunen board ceased operations after the decision, and the party was left to the old leader. A well-known right-wing radical Vietti Nykänen was elected the new vice chairman.

=== Last years ===
After the election of summer 1948 the politics of Hentunen became even more resentful and grudge-filled. The party activity was characterized more and more by the court battles directed at and made by Hentunen himself. In the spring 1949, the state president Juho Kusti Paasikivi ordered prosecution against Hentune for the defamation of a foreign state. The president was annoyed by the critical discourse the Totuuden Torvi had taken against the Soviet Union. The Municipal Court, however, set aside the indictment in June. Hentunen was not seen to have caused any danger to the Finnish state relations. After the decision, Paasikivi asked the government to change criminal law so that similar could not happen again. The Court of Appeal overturned the lower court decision in August and sentenced Hentunen to 100 day fine, and the president abandoned his plans to amend legislation.

In the early 1950s, the activity of Radical People's Party and Hentunen was directed specifically against the liberal People's Party of Finland (KP). Hentunen thought that the KP had stolen the name of his party, and the matter was taken to court. In the summer of 1951, the party participated in the parliamentary elections again, but their support did not increase. The election campaign was an attack against the communists and the prime minister Urho Kekkonen. After the elections, the party changed direction once again. Criticism of the communists was abandoned and workers' rights were taken to the heart of party propaganda. This phase was cut short when Hentunen died in November of that year.

Party activities withered away after Hentunen's death. In 1956, however, the association held its annual meeting, which was attended by about 20 people. Economist Harald Hjelt was elected chairman. This was preceded by a third coming of the Totuuden Torvi in 1954. The paper appeared for the last time in 1958. Some of the people behind the new coming were those who in 1948 lost the conflict with Hentunen.

== Program ==
The program of the Radical People's Party was first published in November 1944 as a paid notice in the Helsingin Sanomat. The final version was not published until 1946. The program was essentially radical and left-wing, but it also included some pacifist points and demands usually supported by radical right-wing groups. For a party program, it was exceptionally fragmented and propagandist.

The purpose of the association was to develop state capitalism by giving land to the landless, nationalising industrial plants and companies and to rearrange the monetary system. The party wanted to limit farm size to 5-15 hectare, and to seize the land of the church, local companies and municipalities. It wanted to nationalize the Retail stores, industry, banks, pharmacy, Cooperative stores, town halls and printing houses.

The other demands of the party were, among other things, amnesty for military deserters and war-time prisoners, and the establishment of People's Militia to replace the army. Housing shortages were to be solved by having a right to only own one apartment in the cities. The party wanted to close down Finland's foreign missions and sack their officials. Criminals were to be expelled to the countryside and recidivists to be sent to penal colonies for life. The death penalty was not ruled out of question by the party.

In 1948, a heading in Totuuden Torvi read as follows: "Radical means: To go deep in the roots of problems and to improve them at a fast pace."

== Totuuden Torvi ==
Totuuden Torvi, where radical ideas were raised, began its publication in January 1945. Hentunen had published a magazine of the same name already in the 1920s and 1930s, and the new Torvi went largely along the same lines. Rulers were severely criticized. Before the 1945 parliamentary elections the paper attacked especially the National Coalition Party. Totuuden Torvi appeared on every second Saturday. The Radical People's Party got most of its funds from the economically successful Totuuden Torvi, with the rest coming from Hentunen himself.

Totuuden Torvi got into trouble with the authorities as soon as the first issue hit the newsstands. The military leadership called for action against the magazine, but the Ministry of the Interior did not share the opinion. At the end of its first year the situation became more difficult, when the Totuuden Torvi had its access to paper restricted. The magazine was classified as humour paper, and its appearance was inhibited by March 1946. Above all, however, stood the political reasons. The paper's style departed radically from the other publications of the time, and it irritated leading politicians from the far left to the far right. After the cancellation of Totuuden Torvi, the Radical People's Party announced its policy through flyers and numerous speech events.

Totuuden Torvi was able to continue after a break of one year in March 1947. Getting paper was still difficult and Hentunen apparently had to rely on the black market, which increased costs. The paper, however, became more popular than ever. Most severe criticism was now aimed at the communists. The writings influenced the government's willingness to impose stricter censorship laws in early 1947. In August 1947, the anti-USSR writings led to the seizure of an issue under martial law. The magazine had dealt with Finns returning from the Soviet Union and the Porkkala Naval Base, which was being leased to the Soviet Union. Hentunen subsequently printed flyers named Kansa huutaa ("The people shout"), which were also banned. Later that same year, Totuuden Torvi was once again permitted to continue when the exemption laws were repealed.

== Elections ==
Results
Parliament
Year	MPs	Votes	
1945	0	1,623	0.10%
1948	0	5,162	0.27%
1951	0	4,486	0.25%

The Radical People's Party began to prepare for the March 1945 parliamentary elections in January. The party offered an electoral coalition to the Finnish People's Democratic League and the Socialist Parliamentary Group (also known as the Sixes). However, they refused, and the party was left alone in the elections. Their purpose was to participate in elections around the country, but eventually the party only managed to present lists in Uusimaa. In the Häme North constituency all the radical lists and candidates were rejected due to errors contained in the papers. The party was not allowed to speak on the radio like the other parties.

In 1947, the radicals took part in the city council elections in Helsinki with six lists. Election Manifesto emphasized particularly some construction projects, and the campaign attacked the Communists. Hentunen rose to the council.

The 1948 parliamentary election campaign was marked by internal party disputes. Two rival radical parties participated and fought each other. Hentunen's radicals had lists in six constituencies (Tavastia South, Tavastia North Kuopio West, Kymi, Uusimaa, Vaasa East) and those led by Toivo Avokari in two (Kymi, Uusimaa). One of the four candidates of the Avokari faction was Veikko Lavi. The campaign slogan for the Hentunen faction was: "Justice to all, Communism for no-one." The radicals planned electoral alliances with the Smallholders Party and the Christian Workers' Party but they did not materialize.

In the Finnish presidential election 1950 the party called for an electoral boycott because there were no suitable candidates. In the 1951 parliamentary elections the radicals had 27 candidates, more than ever before. Party lists stood in five constituencies (Kuopio West, Kymi, Uusimaa, Vaasa South and Vaasa East) and chairman Hentunen was present in all of these.

The party called for a reform to the electoral law. The radicals wanted to make the country into one single constituency, to reduce the number of MPs by half, to limit MPs serving to two periods and to raise the eligibility age of candidates to 40 years.
