= National Socialist Union of Finland =

National Socialist Union of Finland Suomen Kansallissosialistinen Liitto
- Leader: Yrjö Ruutu
- Secretary: Juhani Konkka
- Founded: 1932
- Dissolved: 1937
- Newspaper: Kansallissosialisti
- Propaganda wing: National Socialist Labor Organisation
- Ideology: Strasserism; Finnish nationalism Anti-capitalism
- Political position: Far-right

Party flag
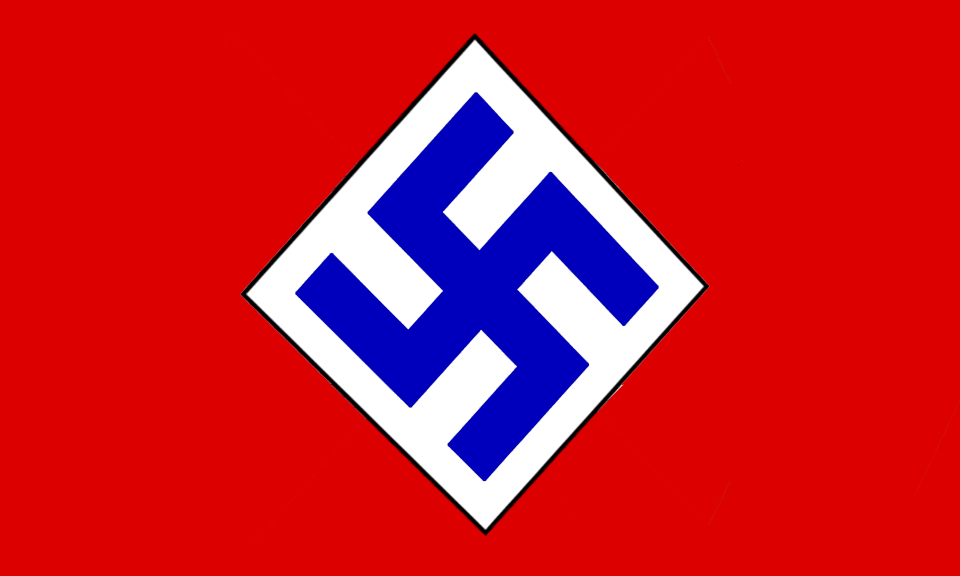

The National Socialist Union of Finland (Finnish: Suomen Kansallissosialistinen Liitto, SKSL), later the Finnish-Socialist Party (Suomalaissosialistinen puolue), was a Finnish Nazi political party active in the 1930s, whose driving force and ideologue was Professor Yrjö Ruutu. With an ideology based on Ruutu's theories, the party came to reject orthodox German Nazism.

A minor fringe party, it received 1,406 votes in the 1933 Finnish parliamentary election.

Several prominent politicians of the right-wing faction of the post-war Social Democratic Party of Finland began their political careers in Ruutu's party.

== History ==
SKSL was founded on September 7, 1932. In addition to Ruutu, who was elected chairman and declared the party "chief" (analogous to Führer), the first party board included Paavo Virtanen, Heikki Waris and Juhani Konkka. The new organization had been planned for several years and had its roots in the Vasama Association, founded by Ruutu in 1924. In the autumn of 1932, the organisation's name was changed to the Helsinki National Socialist Association, and it became the local branch of SKSL. Kansallissosialisti (National Socialist), a party organ, also began to appear in September. SKSL received support from, among others, the Free Workers' Union, from which a group led by Einar Lindholm split. In the winter of 1932–1933, SKSL organized numerous events that attracted hundreds of people.

The party used uniforms, the Roman salute and swastikas. Ruutu was also the first to introduce the concept of Volksgemeinschaft to the Finnish political lexicon. Ruutu was attracted to fascism by the promise of removing class conflict and an economic theory that puts the "national whole" first. Ruutu's ideology was closer to the left-wing of the Nazi party. However, this was no obstacle to joining for prominent Finnish orthodox Nazis such as Yrjö Raikas and Ensio Uoti and party members were later recruited to the Waffen SS.

After Hitler came to power in 1933, Ruutu began to criticize the German Nazis, especially after Hitler had destroyed the Strasserists and the Sturmabteilung in 1934. For Ruutu, Hitler and Goebbels were traitors of true National Socialism who had sold out to big business. Ruutu expelled the supporters of Hitlerite Nazism from his party and adopted the new name Finnish-Socialist Party. The party's newspaper published articles praising Turkish President Kemal Atatürk and his "Turkish socialism" or Kemalism.

The SKSL competed with the Finnish People's Organisation (Suomen Kansan Järjestö, SKJ) led by Captain Arvi Kalsta, another major Finnish Nazi organisation. The SKSL and the SKJ disagreed about the language question. While the SKSL insisted on Finnish-language nationalism, the SKJ was bilingual, had many prominent Swedish-speaking Finnish Nazis such as Hjalmar von Bonsdorff and Himmler's personal friend Thorvald Oljemark and was popular among the Swedish-speaking population of Uusimaa.

== Ideology ==
Ruutu had developed the idea of uniting nationalism and socialism in the early 1920s and concluded that the Finnish national interests required the abandonment of both Marxism and laissez-faire capitalism. Of the contemporary European Fascists and Nazis who presented similar ideas, Ruutu's thinking differed, for example, in that he supported parliamentarism and did not believe in establishing a dictatorship.

The party demanded the nationalization of large companies and other assets vital for national interests, a self-sufficient planned economy and parliament controlled by trade unions, the appointment of technocrats to ministers, the removal of Swedish as an official language of Finland and the removal of Swedish-language education from universities. It also demanded the creation of a Greater Finland, achieved through international cooperation.

== Legacy ==
Some former members of Ruutu's party, such as Yrjö Kilpeläinen and Unto Varjonen, became prominent figures in the right-wing faction of the post-war Social Democratic Party of Finland. Another prominent former member Vietti Nykänen became the vice chairman of the Radical People's Party. Member of the board of the party Heikki Waris later became Minister of Social Affairs in Von Fieandt Cabinet.

After the end of his party in 1937, Ruutu initially joined the SDP, and afterwards, in post-war Finland, made a political career in the far left Socialist Unity Party. He was also the chairman of the secularist Union of Freethinkers of Finland.

== Election results ==
=== Parliament of Finland ===
Date	Votes			Seats		Position	Size
Date	#	%	± pp	#	±	Position	Size
1933	1,406	0.13%	+ 0.13	0 / 200	▲	No seats	11th
