= Kukkarokivi =

Glacial erratic in Turku, Finland

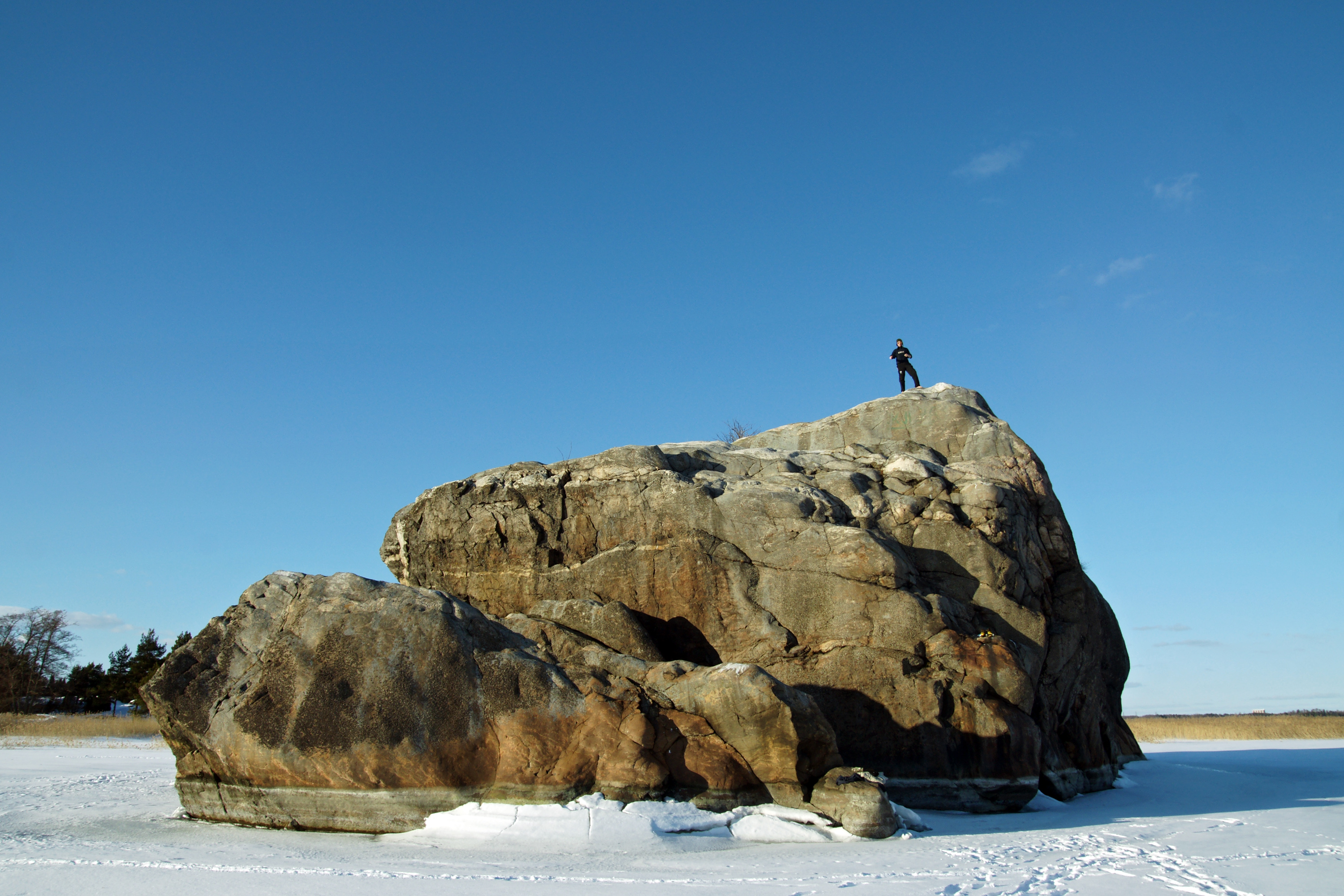
Kukkarokivi in the winter.

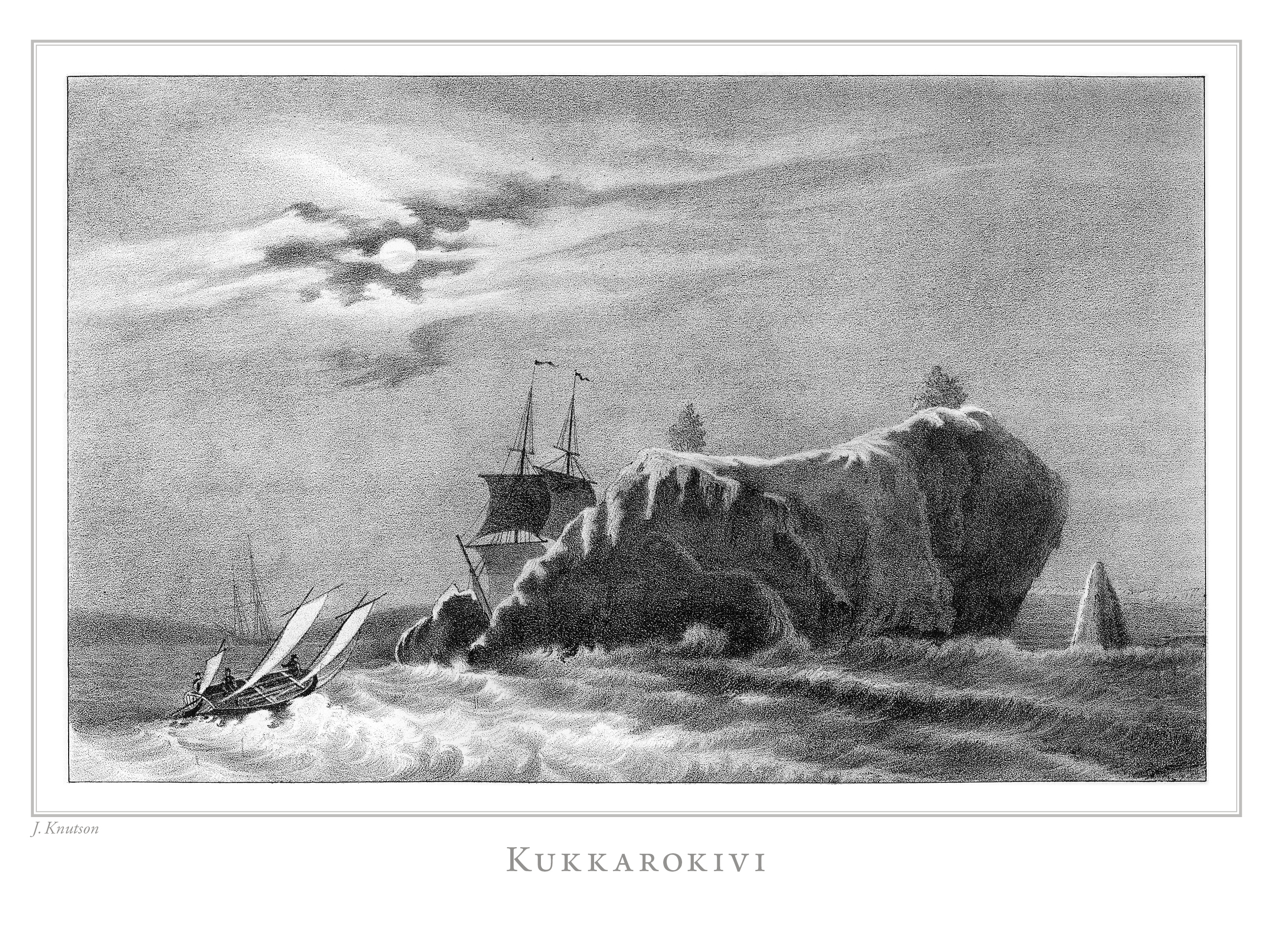
Kukkarokivi in Finland framstäldt i teckningar published 1845-1852.

Kukkarokivi is Finland's largest glacial erratic, located in Ruissalo, Turku.

According to Finnish folklore, the medieval church in Raisio was built by two giants called Killi and Nalli. However, the giants later got into an argument with the priest of the church. Killi decided to destroy the church with a boulder, but once he found a suitable boulder, he was unable to find his way back to the church. In his anger, the giant threw the rock down in its current location in Ruissalo.

== See also ==
- Church Builders Killi and Nalli
- Nunnavuori
- Piispanristi
- Pallivahankivi
