= Harry Kivijärvi =

Finnish sculptor

Harry Kivijärvi (1931–2010) was a sculptor from Finland.

Kivijärvi's most famous works, such as the monument to the memory of president Paasikivi, consist of non-representational forms, sculpted from black stone, whose carefully worked surfaces alternate between smoothly polished areas and sections that have been left rough.

== Biography ==
Kivijärvi was born in Turku and studied in Turku Drawing School 1947–1950 and in Academy of Arts 1950–1952. Kivijärvi started his career in art as a painter. He took up sculpture after spending time in Rome 1955–1956. His first sculptures were small, figurative metal sculptures. The first non-figurative sculpture was monument to Uno Cygnaeus in Hämeenlinna in middle of 1960s. During his career Kivijärvi made many public memorials and monuments.

His works include Church builders Killi and Nalli in Raisio.
