= J. K. Paasikivi Memorial =

Sculpture in Helsinki

Coordinates: 60°10′15.262″N 24°56′9.035″E

The J. K. Paasikivi Memorial, also called Itä ja Länsi ('East and West') is a memorial sculpture for the Finnish president Juho Kusti Paasikivi by the sculptor Harry Kivijärvi, located in Kamppi, Helsinki. The sculpture is located at Paasikivenaukio Square along Mannerheimintie in front of the so-called Supplier House, north of the Lasipalatsi building. The sculpture was revealed in 1980.

== Description ==
The sculpture consists of two black, smooth and convex stone slabs standing upright on a three-step pedestal. The sculpture is 5.5 metres tall and weighs 40 tonnes. The stones are made of black diorite mined from the Mustakivi Oy quarry in Kuokkala, Jyväskylä.

== Epitaph ==
The middle step of the pedestal bears an inscription with Paasikivi's name and the epitaph "The start of all wisdom is acknowledging the facts" in both Finnish and Swedish. Paasikivi famously used this statement on his second term as Prime Minister of Finland in a speech he gave on the Finnish Independence Day in 1944, where he described the necessities of post-war politics in Finland. In his speech Paasikivi said the statement had originally been stated by "a certain historian-thinker". The quote is probably originally from the 19th-century British historian Thomas Carlyle, but Paasikivi was quoting it via the texts of Johan Vilhelm Snellman. Carlyle's contemporary Thomas Macaulay has sometimes been cited as the original author of the sentence instead of Carlyle himself.

== History ==
The original contest for a memorial to J. K. Paasikivi was held in 1970. The first place was split between Harry Kivijärvi's design Rinnakkaiselo ("Living together") and Kain Tapper's design Paasikiven linja ("The Paasikivi doctrine"). This decision caused controversy, as both designs were seen to be modified versions of earlier works by their creators, contrary to the contest's rules. Tapper's design was said to resemble his earlier work Mustalaisen puukko ("The knife of the Romani"), while Kivijärvi's design was said to resemble several of his earlier works. Kivijärvi had made several minimalist sculptures based on black stone slabs since the 1960s, of which many feature a portal design created by two stones standing next to each other. In actuality, the similarity was because of Kivijärvi's and Tapper's styles of sculptures instead of copying an individual earlier work. Nevertheless, the contest had to be held again. Kivijärvi won the new contest in 1976 with his changed design Itä ja Länsi, which lacked the horizontal architrave stone from the original design.

The city of Helsinki first offered the Hesperia esplanade in Töölö as the location of the memorial, but a better option was to place it at the Arkadianaukio square near the city centre and the Parliament House. The memorial was revealed on the 110th anniversary of Paasikivi's birth on 27 November 1980.

The Paasikivi memorial was the first abstract memorial in honour of a Finnish chief of state. A non-realistic memorial caused intense controversy at the time. A popular nickname for the sculpture was "Juho Kusti and Alli", as the two chubby stone slabs were said to resemble Paasikivi himself and his wife Alli.

== Other memorials ==
As well as the memorial in Helsinki, a realistic statue of J. K. Paasikivi was built in Lahti in 1961 and busts of Paasikivi in Mukkula in the 1960s and in Kerava in 1974.

== Sources ==
- Harry Kivijärvi – ja se mitä taiteeksikin sanotaan, publications of the Wäinö Aaltonen museum issue #53, Turku 2008. ISBN 978-952-9565-53-5
