= Luolavuori Cave =

Cave in Luolavuori, Finland

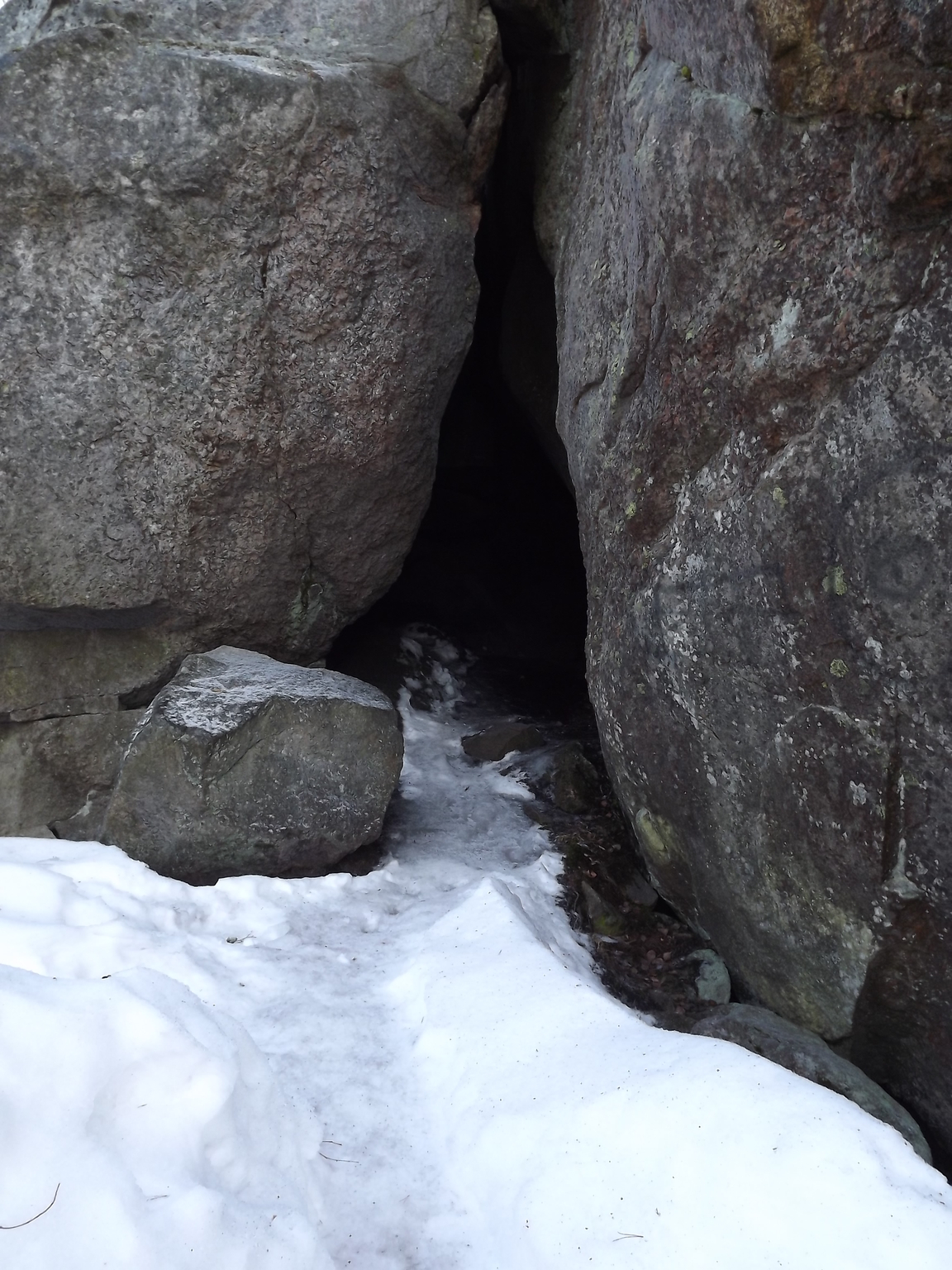
Opening of the cave

The Cave of Luolavuori is a cave located in the area of Luolavuori. The cave is about 50–60 meters deep.

Many local legends are associated with the cave, including that Finnish students went into the cave but got stuck and never came back.

Another story says that the cave used to even extend into the Turku castle, which is perhaps true, as when a water tower was built in Luolavuori a part of the cave could have collapsed.

Other stories say that criminals used to use the cave as a hiding place.

== See also ==
- Piispanristi
- Nunnavuori
