= Church builders Killi and Nalli =

Sculpture by Harry Kivijärvi

Coordinates: 60°29′05″N 22°10′29″E

Church Builders Killi and Nalli is a public sculpture in Raisio, Finland. Created by the sculptor Harry Kivijärvi in red granite, it stands in the park area between Raisio City Hall and the Church of St. Martin.

The sculpture, which stylistically depicts two humanlike figures, is based on a folk song for the kantele, according to which the giants Killi and Nalli built the church in Raisio 700 years ago.

== See also ==
- Kukkarokivi
- Nunnavuori
