= Luolavuori =

District of Turku, Finland

Coordinates: 60°25′55″N 22°16′50″E

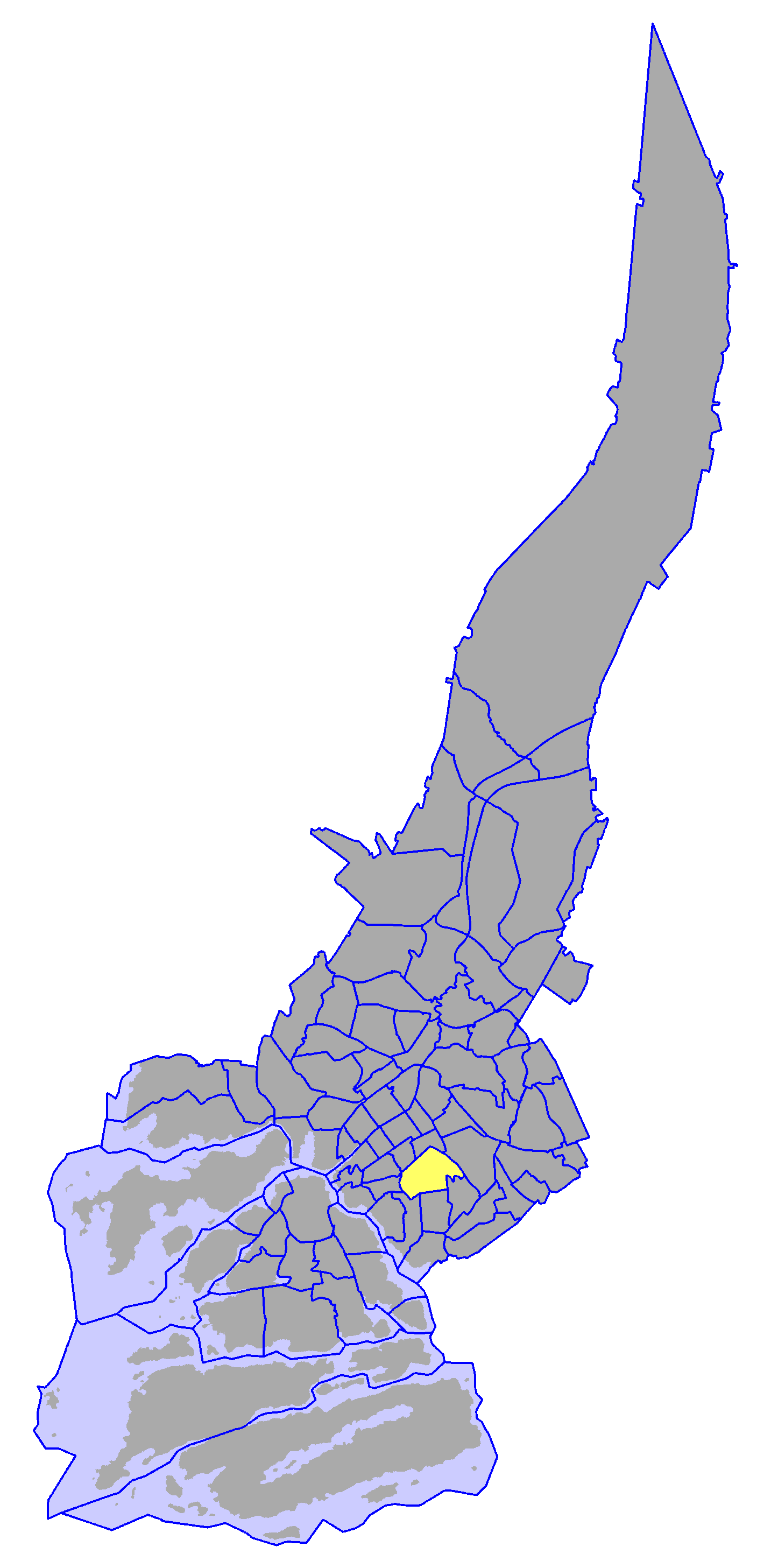
Luolavuori on a map of Turku.

Luolavuori is a district in the Uittamo-Skanssi ward of the city of Turku, in Finland. It is located to the southeast of the city centre, and is mainly parkland. There is a large old people's home in Luolavuori.

The current (as of 2004) population of Luolavuori is 4,477, and it is decreasing at an annual rate of 0.92%. 9.00% of the district's population are under 15 years old, while 36.48% are over 65. The district's linguistic makeup is 92.52% Finnish, 6.21% Swedish, and 1.27% other.

== See also ==
- Districts of Turku
- Districts of Turku by population
- Cave of Luolavuori
