= Pallivahankivi =

Glacial boulder in Turku, Finland

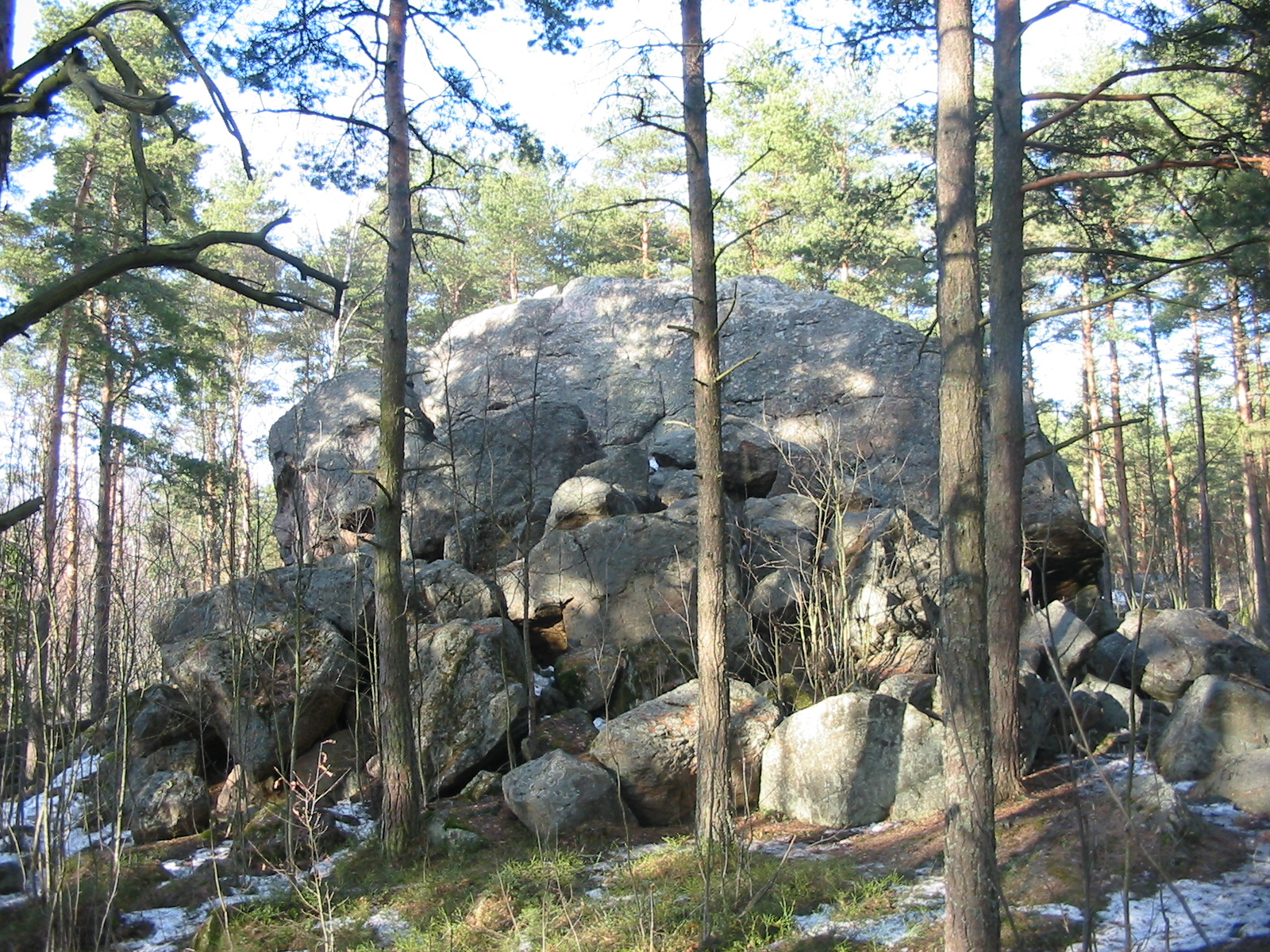
Pallivahankivi in 2011.

Pallivahankivi is a 10-meter-tall (33 ft) glacially deposited rock located in the region of Pallivaha. The region of Pallivaha is named after the rock. The rock is associated with a Finnish folk legend, according to which it was hurled into its current place by giants from the region of Nunnavuori. Later legends say that the rock became a shelter for criminals who lived in the area.

== See also ==
- Piispanristi
- Nunnavuori
- Church builders Killi and Nalli
