= Alli Paasikivi =

Finnish benefactor and second wife of president Juho Kusti Paasikivi (1879–1960)

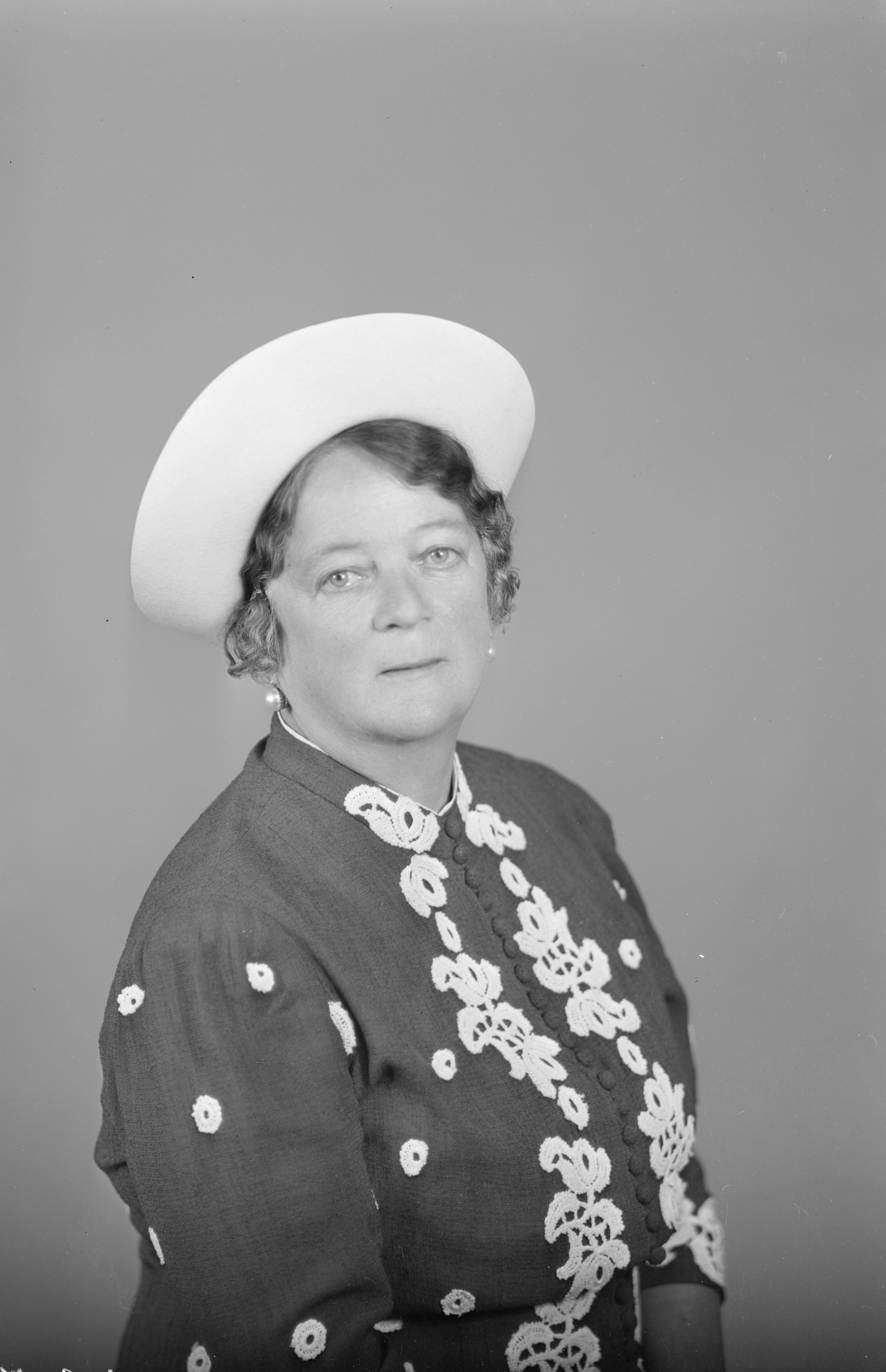
- Alli Paasikivi in 1940
- Born: Allina Amanda Hildén; 19 December 1879; Kärkölä, Grand Duchy of Finland
- Died: 13 June 1960 (aged 80); Helsinki, Finland
- Occupations: Actor, bank administrator
- Spouse: Juho Kusti Paasikivi (m. 1934; died 1956)

Alli Paasikivi (née Valve, previously Hildén; 19 December 1879 – 13 June 1960) was the second wife of Finland's seventh president, Juho Kusti Paasikivi, serving as the First Lady of Finland from 1946 until 1956.

In her early 20s, Alli Valve worked as an actor at the Finnish National Theatre, before switching to a banking career. It was while working at the KOP bank that she met her future husband, working as a manager at the same bank; the couple got married in 1934.

As the First Lady, Alli Paasikivi took an active role in mediating between her husband and other politicians and peer groups, and is known to have acted as a private secretary to him, taking phone calls and opening incoming correspondence, to some extent even deciding which matters to put before the president.

She was also actively involved in many social welfare and charitable initiatives, especially in the areas of families, children, and the disabled. She served as the honorary chairwoman and patron of the charitable Alli Paasikivi Foundation from its foundation in 1952 until her death.
