= Juho Kusti Paasikivi =

President of Finland from 1946 to 1956

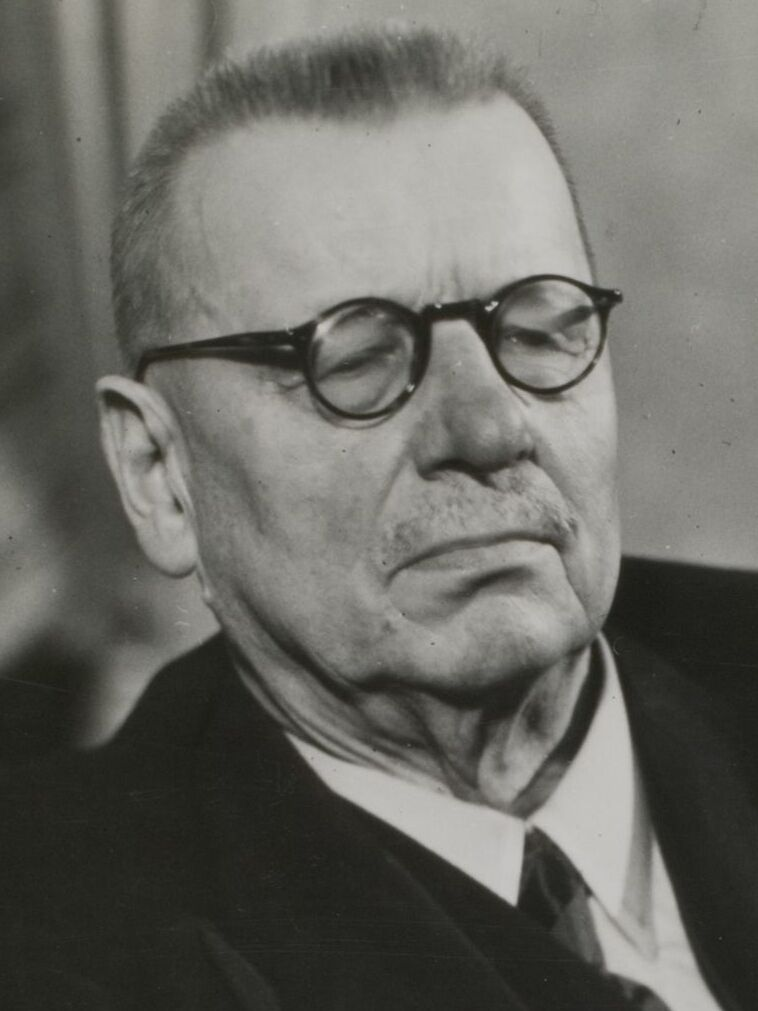
- Paasikivi in 1945

7th President of Finland
- In office 11 March 1946 – 1 March 1956
- Prime Minister: Mauno Pekkala; Karl-August Fagerholm; Urho Kekkonen; Sakari Tuomioja; Ralf Törngren
- Preceded by: Gustaf Mannerheim
- Succeeded by: Urho Kekkonen

2nd Prime Minister of Finland
- In office 17 November 1944 – 9 March 1946
- President: Gustaf Mannerheim
- Preceded by: Urho Castrén
- Succeeded by: Mauno Pekkala
- In office 27 May 1918 – 27 November 1918
- Preceded by: Pehr Evind Svinhufvud
- Succeeded by: Lauri Ingman

Chairman of the Senate of Finland
- In office 27 May 1918 – 27 November 1918
- Preceded by: Pehr Evind Svinhufvud
- Succeeded by: Lauri Ingman (as Prime Minister)

Personal details
- Born: Johan Gustaf Hellsten; 27 November 1870 Koski Hl, Grand Duchy of Finland, Russian Empire
- Died: 14 December 1956 (aged 86) Helsinki, Finland
- Resting place: Hietaniemi Cemetery
- Party: Finnish Party (1906–1918); National Coalition Party (from 1918)
- Spouse(s): Anna Matilda Forsman (desc.); Allina (Alli) Valve
- Children: 4
- Education: Imperial Alexander University (now University of Helsinki)
- Profession: statesman, professor, attorney

Juho Kusti Paasikivi (Note: Finnish pronunciation: [ˈjuho ˈkusti ˈpɑːsiˌkiʋi]) (27 November 1870 – 14 December 1956) was a Finnish politician who served as the president of Finland from 1946 to 1956. Representing the Finnish Party until its dissolution in 1918 and then the National Coalition Party, he previously served as senator, member of parliament (1907–1909, 1910–1914), envoy to Stockholm (1936–1939) and Moscow (1940–1941), and Prime Minister of Finland (1918 and 1944–1946). He also held several other positions of trust, and was an influential figure in Finnish economics and politics for over fifty years.

Paasikivi has been remembered as a tenacious and temperamental character, but also as a realistic peace negotiator and a main architect of Finland's foreign policy after the Second World War; for example, the Paasikivi Society (Paasikivi-seura), founded in 1958 under the leadership of Jan-Magnus Jansson, sought to nurture Paasikivi's political legacy, especially during the Cold War, by promoting 'fact-based foreign policy thinking' in Finland and making Finland's policy of neutrality internationally known. Paasikivi was also the last Finnish president born in the 1800s and the "lowest" in terms of social origin.

== Early life and political career ==
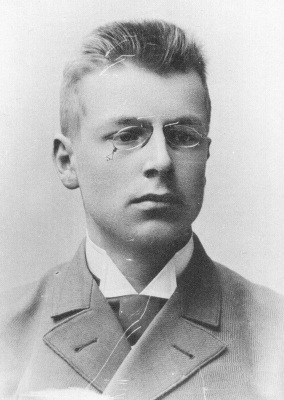
J.K. Paasikivi in 1893

=== Birth and childhood ===
Paasikivi was born Johan Gustaf Hellsten (Finland Swedish pronunciation: [ˈjuhɑn ˈgʉstɑːf ˈhelːsteːn]) in 1870 at the smoke sauna of the Kulma-Seppälä house in the Huljala village of Koski Hl (today Hämeenkoski) in Southern Finland, to Tamperean travelling merchant August Hellsten and his wife, Karolina Wilhelmina, née Selin. Hellsten's parents lived in Tampere, but the son was born on their business trip to the Lahti market. After returning home, Hellsten was officially entered in Tampere's church books. Hellsten's mother died when he was four, and his father died in debt when Hellsten was 14. Hellsten's half-sister Karolina died soon after. Upon his father's death, Hellsten's aunt, Kaisa Hagman, assumed responsibility for his raising. Hellsten Finnicized his name to Juho Kusti Paasikivi in 1885. His surname literally means "flagstone" in both languages.

=== Education ===
The young Paasikivi was an enthusiastic athlete and gymnast. His father had recognized his son's academic talent and enrolled him at a top elementary school in Hämeenlinna following brief attendance at Hollola. Paasikivi exhibited an early appetite for reading, and was the best pupil in his class. He entered the University of Helsinki in 1890, graduating in May 1892 with a Bachelor's degree in Russian language and literature, a course of studies that proved useful in later life. He also studied law at the universities of Leipzig, Stockholm and Uppsala, receiving his Doctor of Law in 1902. During his schooling, Paasikivi supported himself by working variously as a teacher, lecturer, court bailiff, and lawyer in private practice in Lahti. It was also during his university studies, around 1894, that Paasikivi first became involved in the Fennoman movement, assuming leadership roles in its student organization.

=== First marriage and family ===
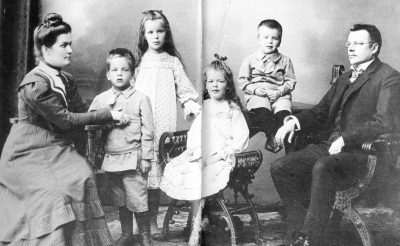
Family of J. K. Paasikivi in 1906. From left to right: Paasikivi's first wife Anna (née Forsman), their children Juhani, Annikki, Vellamo, Varma, and Paasikivi himself.

On 1 June 1897 Paasikivi married Swedish-born Anna Matilda Forsman (1869–1931). Together they had four children, Annikki (1898–1950), Wellamo (1900–1966), Juhani (1901–1942), and Varma (1903–1941). Upon earning his doctorate in law in 1901, Paasikivi took on an associate professorship of Administrative Law at Helsinki University from 1902 to 1903.

=== Introduction to politics ===
Paasikivi left this post to become Director-in-Chief of Treasury of the Grand Duchy of Finland, a position he retained until 1914. For practically all of his adult life, Paasikivi moved in the inner circles of Finland's politics. He supported greater autonomy and an independent Cabinet (Senate) for Finland, and resisted Russia's panslavic intentions to make Russian the only official language everywhere in the Russian Empire. He belonged, however, to the more complying Finnish Party, opposing radical and potentially counter-productive steps which could be perceived as aggressive by the Russians. Paasikivi served as a Finnish Party member of Parliament 1907–1909 and 1910–1913. He served as a member of the Senate 1908–1909, as head of the finance division.

== Independence and Civil War ==
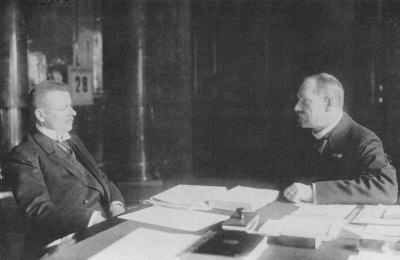
Paasikivi (left) and P. E. Svinhufvud discuss the Finnish monarchy project in 1918.

During the First World War Paasikivi began to doubt the Finnish Party's obedient line. In 1914, after resigning his position at the Treasury, and also standing down as a member of Parliament, Paasikivi left public life and office. He became Chief General Manager of the Kansallis-Osake-Pankki (KOP) bank, retaining that position until 1934. Paasikivi also served as a member of the City Council of Helsinki 1915–1918.

After the 1917 February Revolution in Russia, Paasikivi was appointed to the committee that began formulating new legislation for a modernized Grand Duchy. Initially he supported increased autonomy within the Russian state, in opposition to the Social Democrats in the coalition-Senate, who in vain strove for more far-reaching autonomy; but after the 1917 Bolshevik October Revolution, Paasikivi championed full independence—in the form of constitutional monarchy.

During the Civil War in Finland Paasikivi stood firmly on the side of the White government. As prime minister from May until November 1918, he strove for a continued constitutional monarchy with Frederick Charles of Hesse, a German Prince, as king, intending to ensure German support for Finland against Bolshevist Russia. However, as Germany lost the World War, the monarchy had to be scrapped for a republic more in the taste of the victorious Entente. Paasikivi's Senate resigned, and he returned to the KOP bank.

Paasikivi's Senate was in power during the existence of the prison camps following the Civil War in Finland, where 12,000 prisoners died in total. Starvation was seen as a principal cause of mortality in the camps which housed men and women who had fought on the side of the Reds.

Paasikivi, as a political conservative, was a firm opponent of Social Democrats in the cabinet, or communists in the Parliament. Tentatively he supported the semi-fascist Lapua movement, which requested radical measures against the political Left. But eventually the Lapua movement radicalized further, even assaulting Ståhlberg, liberal former president of Finland; and Paasikivi like many other supporters, turned away from the radical right. In 1934 he became chairman of the conservative National Coalition Party, as a champion of democracy, and successfully rehabilitated the party after its suspicious closeness to the Lapua movement and the failed coup d'état, the Mäntsälä Rebellion.

== Envoy in Stockholm ==
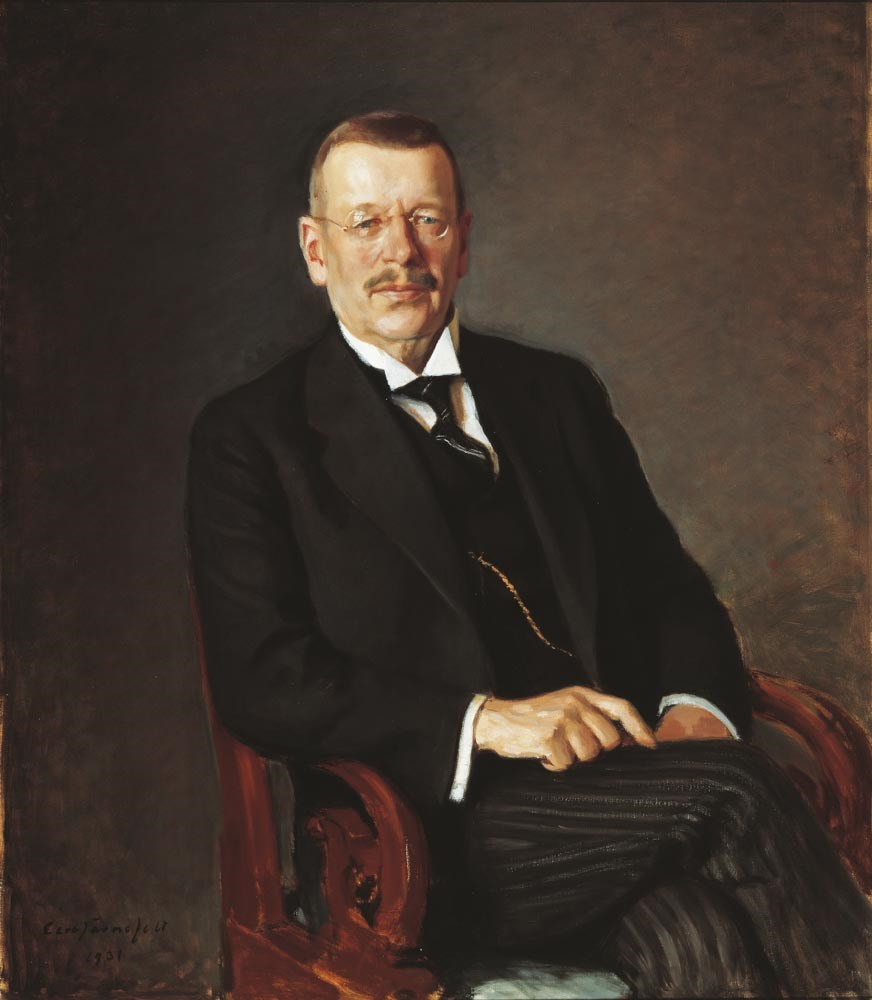
Portrait by Eero Järnefelt in 1931

Widowed in 1931, he married Allina (Alli) Valve (1879–1960) in 1934 and resigned from politics. However, he was persuaded to accept the position of Envoy to Sweden, at the time regarded as Finland's most important foreign embassy post. The threats from totalitarian regimes that had seized power in Germany and the Soviet Union made Finland increasingly isolated. With the gradual weakening of the League of Nations, and France's and the United Kingdom's apparent lack of interest in supporting Finland, Sweden was the only notable power left that could possibly provide Finland any support at all. Since around the time of the failed Lapua coup, Paasikivi and Mannerheim had belonged to a close circle of conservative Finns discussing how Sweden's support could be obtained.

In Stockholm Paasikivi strove for Swedish defence guarantees, alternatively a defensive alliance or a defensive union between Finland and Sweden. Since the Civil War, relations between the Swedes and Finns had been frosty. The revolutionary turmoil at the end of World War I had led to Parliamentarism in Sweden, increased Swedish democracy, and a dominant role for the Swedish Social Democrats. In Finland, however, the result had been a disastrous Civil War and a total defeat for Socialism. At the same time that Paasikivi arrived in Stockholm, it became known that Finnish President Svinhufvud retained his aversion to parliamentarism; and (after pressure from Paasikivi's National Coalition Party) had declined to appoint a cabinet with Social Democrats as Ministers. This didn't improve Paasikivi's reputation among the Swedish Social Democrats dominating the government, who were sufficiently suspicious due to his association with Finland's Monarchist orientation in 1918, and the failed Lapua coup in 1932.

Things actually improved, partly due to Paasikivi's efforts, partly due to President Kallio being elected. As president, Kallio approved of parliamentarism and appointed Social Democrats to the cabinet. But the suspicions between Finland and Sweden were too strong: During the Winter War Sweden's support for Finland was considerable, but short of one critical feature: Sweden neither declared war on the Soviet Union nor sent regular troops to Finland's defense. This made many Finns, including Paasikivi himself, judge his mission in Stockholm a failure.

== Envoy in Moscow ==
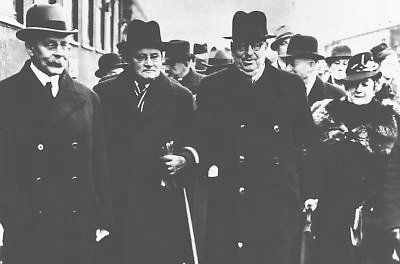
J.K. Paasikivi leaving for Moscow for a first round of negotiations on 9 October 1939. Seeing him off are Prime Minister A. K. Cajander, speaker of Parliament Väinö Hakkila and Mrs. Alli Paasikivi.

Prior to the Winter War, Paasikivi became the Finnish representative in the negotiations in Moscow. Seeing that Joseph Stalin did not intend to change his policies, Paasikivi supported compliance with some of the demands. When the war broke out, Paasikivi was asked to enter Risto Ryti’s cabinet as a minister without portfolio—in practice in the role of a distinguished political advisor. He ended up in the cabinet's leading triumvirate together with Risto Ryti and Foreign Minister Väinö Tanner (chairman of the Social Democrats). Paasikivi also led the negotiations for an armistice and peace, and continued his mission in Moscow as Envoy. In Moscow he was necessarily isolated from the most secret thoughts in Helsinki; and when he found out that these thoughts ran in the direction of revanche, of retaking, with Germany's aid, territory lost in the Winter War, he resigned. Paasikivi retired for the second time.

== Prime minister and president ==
In summer 1941, when the Continuation War began, Paasikivi took up writing his memoirs. By 1943 he had concluded that Germany was going to lose the war and that Finland was in great danger as well. However, his initial opposition to the pro-German politics of 1940–1941 was too well known, and his first initiatives for peace negotiations were met with little support from either Field Marshal Mannerheim or Risto Ryti, who now had become President.

=== From prime minister to president (1946) ===
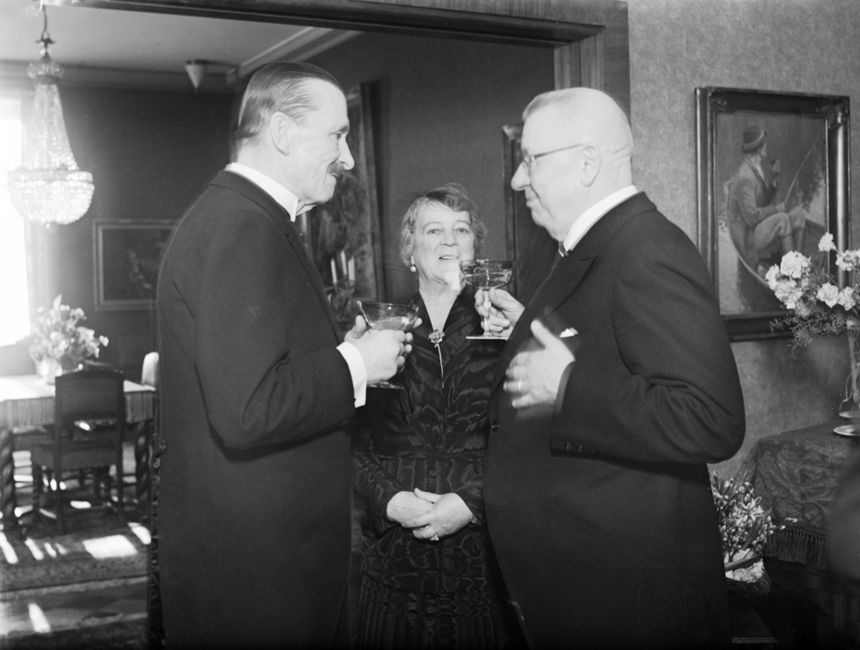
President Paasikivi (right), his wife Alli Paasikivi (middle) and C. G. E. Mannerheim (left) in 1946

Immediately after the war, Mannerheim appointed Paasikivi prime minister. For the first time in Finland a Communist, Yrjö Leino, was included in the cabinet. Paasikivi's policies were to be "realistic", radically different from those of the previous 25 years.

Paasikivi sought to understand why Moscow had ordered the invasion of Finland in 1939. He concluded that interwar Finnish portrayals of the Soviet Union were "heedlessly Russophobic", and that the Soviet attack was legitimate, strategic, and even "defensive" rather than ideological or expansionist. Consequently, he ensured that negative references to the Soviet Union were expunged from school textbooks and that books containing "hostile" representations of the Soviet Union were removed from public libraries.

Paasikivi had to comply with many Soviet demands, including the war crimes trial. His main effort was to prove that Finland would present no threat to the Soviet Union, and that both countries would gain from confident peaceful relations.

When Mannerheim resigned, Parliament selected Paasikivi to succeed him as President of the Republic; Paasikivi was then aged 75.

=== Political evolution ===
Paasikivi had thus come a long way from his earlier classical conservatism. He now was willing to co-operate regularly with the Social Democrats and when necessary, even with the Communists, as long as they acted democratically. As president, he only once accepted his party, the Conservatives, into the government; and even that government lasted only about six months and was considered more a caretaker or civil-servant government than a regular parliamentary government. Paasikivi even appointed a communist, People's Democrat Mauno Pekkala, as prime minister in 1946.

==== Dealing with communists ====
Paasikivi's political flexibility had its limits; this was shown at the time of the communists' alleged coup attempt or coup plans in spring 1948. He ordered some units of the army and navy to Helsinki to defend the capital against a possible communist attack. Any attempted takeover failed before it had even started, and the communists were defeated in the next parliamentary elections.

Most modern Finnish historians deny that most communists wanted a violent coup, especially not without Soviet support. Later in the spring when the Finnish parliament passed a no-confidence motion against Communist Interior Minister Leino because of controversy over Leino's treatment of some mostly White Russian emigrant prisoners whom he had ordered deported to the Soviet Union, Paasikivi had to dismiss Leino when he refused to resign at once. After the 1948 parliamentary elections, when the communists dropped from the largest to the third largest party, Paasikivi refused to let them into the government; and the communists remained in opposition until 1966.

=== "Paasikivi doctrine" ===
As President, Paasikivi kept the foreign relations of Finland in the foreground, trying to ensure a stable peace and wider freedom of action for Finland. Paasikivi concluded that, all the fine rhetoric aside, Finland had to adapt to superpower politics and sign treaties with the Soviet Union to avoid a worse fate. Thus he managed to stabilize Finland's position. This "Paasikivi doctrine" was adhered to for decades, and was named Finlandization in the 1970s.

==== Knowledge of Russian helped ====
Paasikivi's ability to speak some Russian helped his relations with the Soviet leaders; he did not have to use interpreters all the time, as his successor Kekkonen did. Having studied in Russia as a young man, Paasikivi also knew classic Russian literature and Russian culture.

=== 1950 presidential election ===
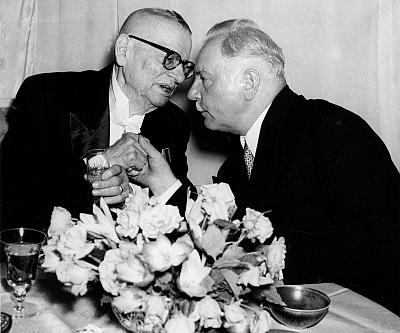
J.K. Paasikivi and chairman of the Supreme Soviet Kliment Voroshilov in Moscow

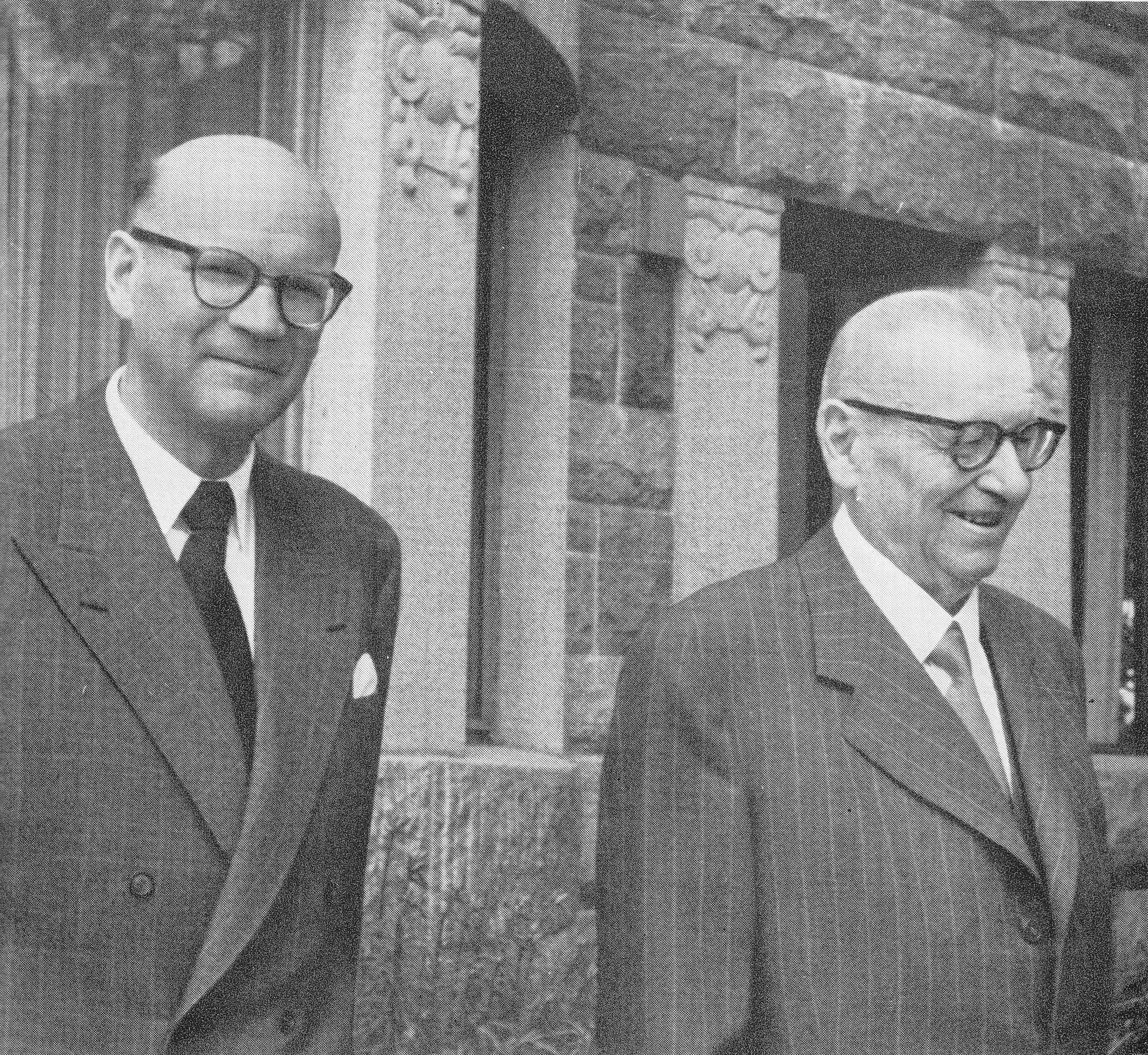
Urho Kekkonen and J. K. Paasikivi in Kultaranta, 1955

Paasikivi stood for re-election in the presidential election of 1950, and he won 171 out of the 300 electoral college votes. The priorities of his second term were centred largely on domestic politics, in contrast to his first term. Joseph Stalin's death made Paasikivi's job easier.

As a lover of sports, and a former athlete and gymnast, Paasikivi had the great pleasure, during his second term of office, of opening the 1952 Summer Olympics held in Helsinki. On the eve of the Summer Olympics, it was only appropriate for the cultured statesman to hold a speech in a world language, English. However, English was not Paasikivi’s strong language, as French had long been the predominant language of diplomacy. Still, Paasikivi wanted to extend his greetings to foreign guests arriving in Helsinki. The President's speech was as follows:

It gives me great pleasure to address a message of greeting to the young people of the world as they prepare for the fifteenth Olympic Games which are, once again, to be celebrated in a spirit worthy of the ideals of Baron de Coubertin.

This happy cooperation between young people of all countries will serve the great call of concord and peace among the nations of the world.

I am particularly pleased to be sending you this advance greeting because, as a young man, I was myself an enthusiastic gymnast and athlete. And I have retained throughout my life a deep interest in athletics and sports of all kinds.

I am convinced that the Finnish people, loving sport as they do, will spare no effort to make the 1952 Olympic Games a complete success.

By the end of Paasikivi's six-year second term, Finland had rid itself of the most urgent political problems resulting from the war. The Karelian refugees had been resettled, the war reparations had been paid, rationing had ended, and in January 1956 the Soviet Union removed its troops from the Porkkala naval base near Helsinki.

=== Last minute 1956 candidacy ===
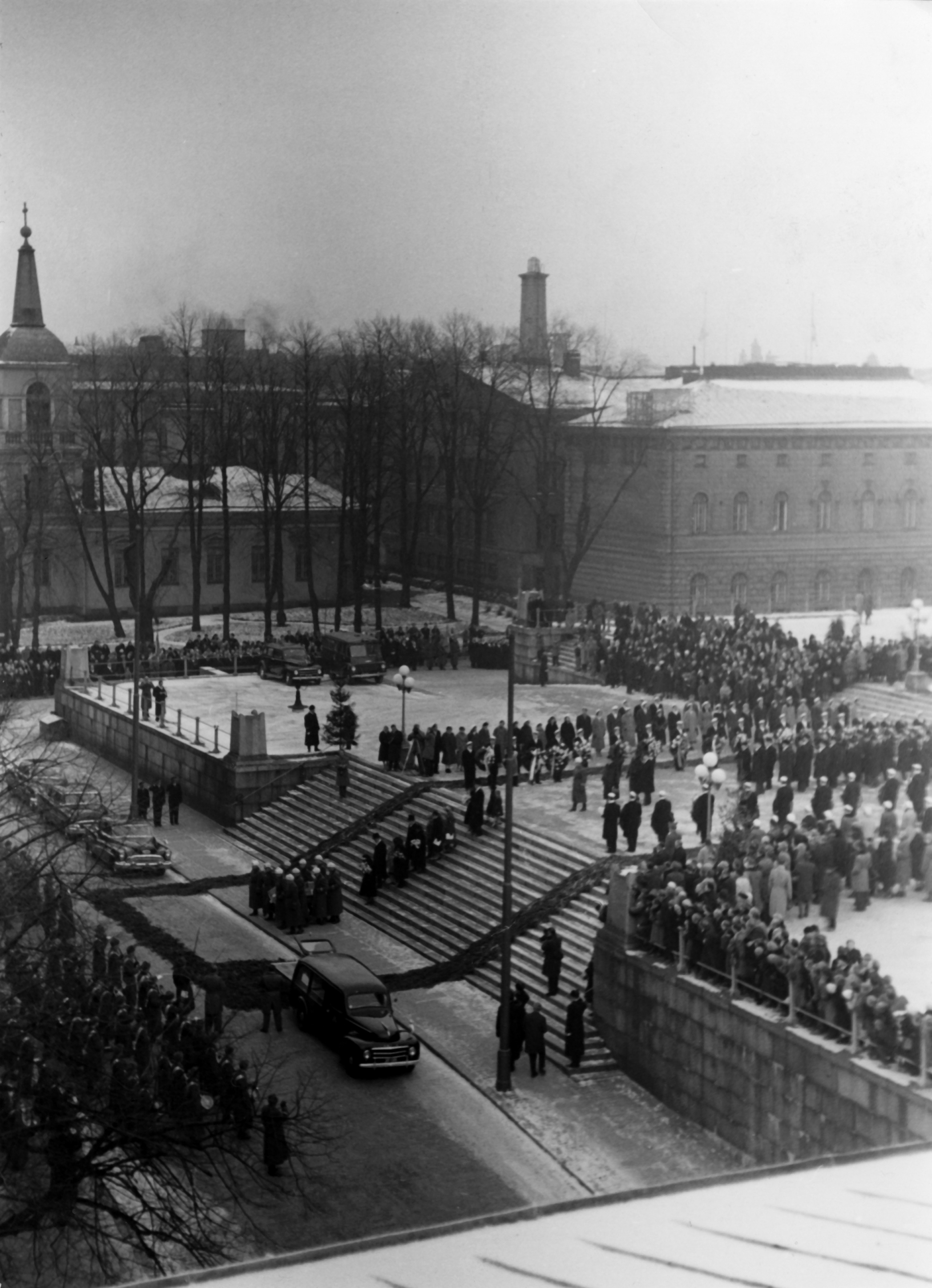
Juho Kusti Paasikivi's funeral parade on 14 December 1956

Paasikivi did not actively seek re-election from his second term ending 1 March 1956, when he was age 85. However, Paasikivi was willing to serve as president for about two more years if a great majority of politicians asked him to do so. He appeared as a dark horse presidential candidate on the second ballot of the electoral college on 15 February 1956, but was eliminated as the least popular candidate. His last-minute candidacy was based on a misunderstood message from some conservatives which made him believe that enough Agrarians and Social Democrats would support him.

After his unsuccessful last-minute presidential candidacy, Paasikivi felt betrayed by those politicians who asked him to participate in the election. He even denied giving his consent to the presidential candidacy in a public statement. He died in December, having not yet finished his memoirs.

== Paasikivi on banknotes ==
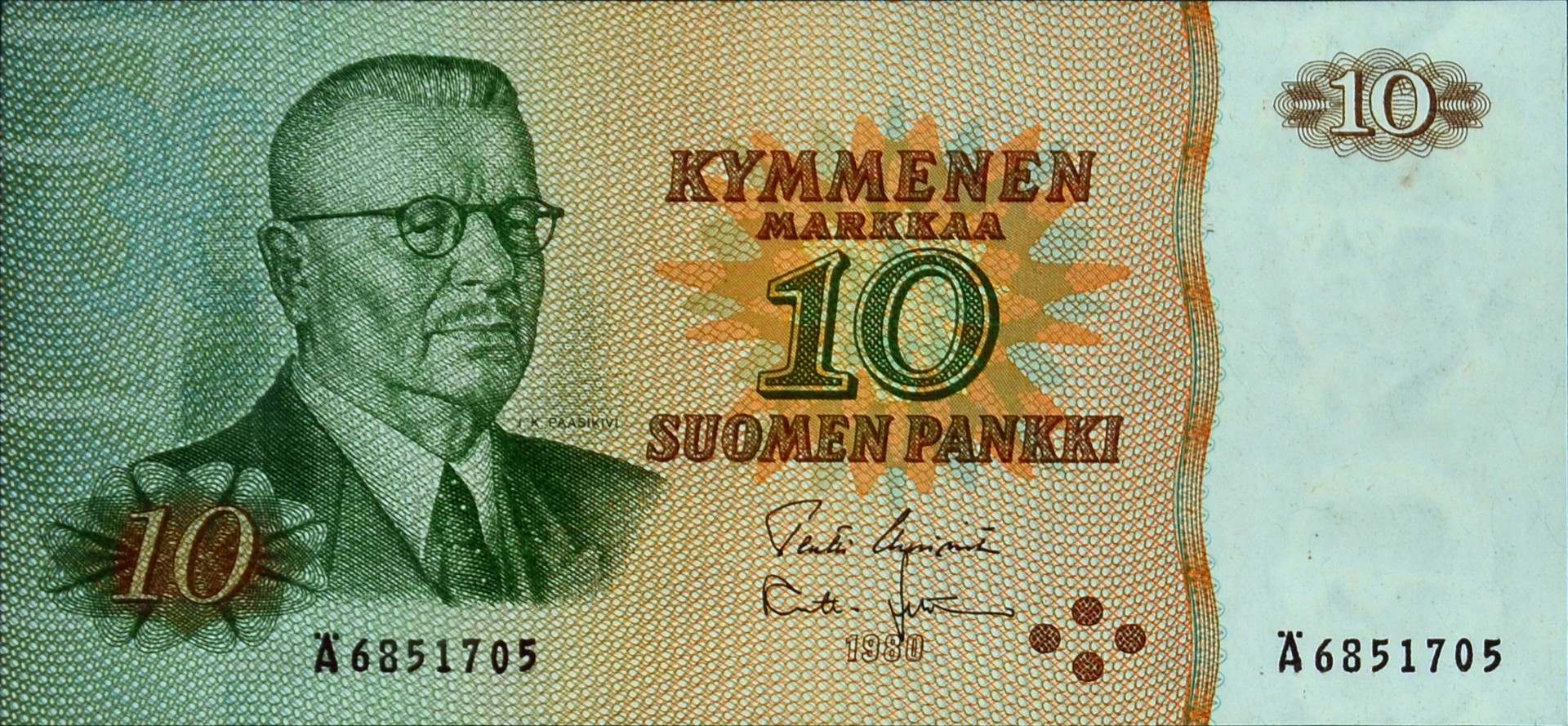
Paasikivi on a Finnish 10 mark banknote from 1980

Paasikivi, who had a strong background in banking, has featured on various Finnish banknotes. He is one of three Finnish presidents whose portrait has appeared on markka-denominated banknotes of Finland. The others were Kaarlo Juho Ståhlberg, the first president of Finland, and Urho Kekkonen, Paasikivi's successor as president.

== Cabinets ==
- Juho Kusti Paasikivi's first senate
- Paasikivi II Cabinet
- Paasikivi III Cabinet

== In popular culture ==
In the 2019 Finnish television series Shadow Lines (Nyrkki), Paasikivi appears as a character with Urho Kekkonen. In the series Paasikivi is played by Sulevi Peltola.

== Honours ==
Coat of Arms of Juho Kusti Paasikivi
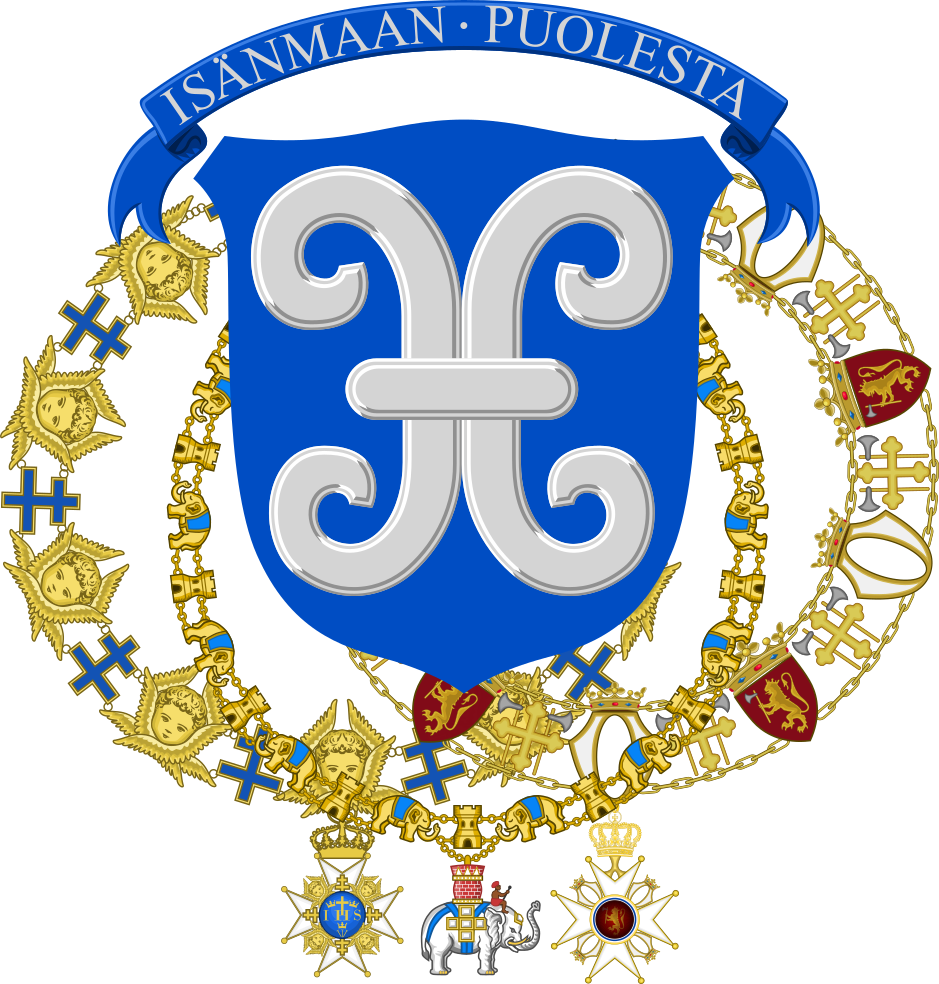
- Armiger: Juho Kusti Paasikivi
- Motto: "Isänmaan puolesta" ("For the Fatherland")

=== National Honours ===
- Finland : Grand Cross with Collar of the Order of the White Rose (1946)
- Finland : Grand Cross of the Order of the White Rose (1922)
- Finland : Grand Cross of the Order of the Lion of Finland
- Finland : Grand Cross of the Order of the Cross of Liberty with Swords (9 October 1950)

=== Foreign ===
- Iceland : Grand Cross with Collar of the Order of the Falcon (24 April 1954)
- Sweden : Knight of the Royal Order of the Seraphim
- Sweden : Order of the Polar Star
- Norway : Grand Cross with Collar of the Order of St. Olav (27 November 1950)
- Denmark : Knight of the Order of the Elephant
- Soviet Union : Order of Lenin
- Russian Empire : Order of St. Anna
  - Poland : Order of St Stanislas
- Prussia : Iron Cross
- France : Legion of Honour

== See also ==
- List of presidents of Finland
- Paasikivi–Kekkonen doctrine
- Paasikivi–Kekkonen Road
- J. K. Paasikivi Memorial

== Bibliography ==
- Browning, Christopher; Lehti, Marko (2011). "Geographic Centrality and Marginality: East, West, and North in Finnish Symbolic Geography". In Alexander Maxwell, ed., The East-West Doctrine: Symbolic Geography and its Consequences, pp. 155–168. Nationalisms Across the Globe. Vol. 8. Bern: Peter Laing. ISBN 978-3-034-30198-5.
- Polvinen, Tuomo; Heikkilä, Hannu; Immonen, Hannu (1989). J. K. Paasikivi : valtiomiehen elämäntyö. Vol. 1: 1870–1918. WSOY.
- Rintala, Marvin (1969). Four Finns. Berkeley, CA: University of California Press.
- Wilsford, David, ed. (1995). Political leaders of contemporary Western Europe: a biographical dictionary. Greenwood. pp. 347–352.

Preceded by President of Portugal; Óscar Carmona	The oldest current head of state 18 April 1951 - 1 March 1956	Succeeded by King of Norway; Haakon VII

Political offices
Preceded by Pehr Evind Svinhufvud	Prime Minister of Finland; 1918	Succeeded by Lauri Ingman
Preceded by Urho Castrén	Prime Minister of Finland; 1944–1946	Succeeded by Mauno Pekkala
Preceded by Carl Gustaf Emil Mannerheim	President of Finland; 1946–1956	Succeeded by Urho Kekkonen
