= Nunnavuori =

Hill in Turku, Finland

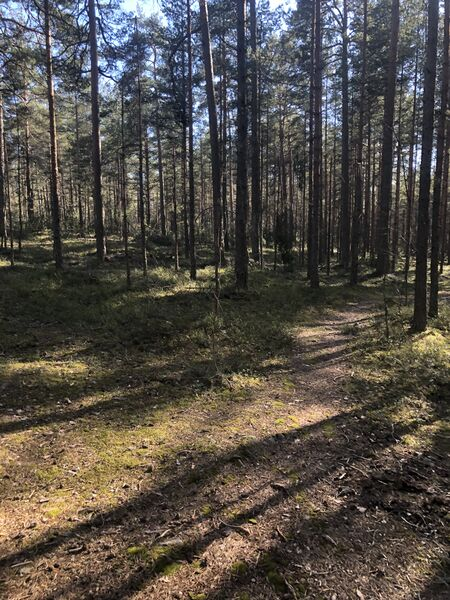
Forest around Nunnavuori

Nunnavuori is a 63-meter tall hill in Finland it is located between the Runosmäki residential area and the Impivaara Sports Center. From the top of the hill, the southern and southeastern parts of Turku are visible.

== History ==
During the ice age all of Nunnavuori was covered by ice, after the ice started to melt, Nunnavuori became a beach which caused rocks to form a shingle beach, which is today called "pirunpelto". The rocks are most often round and smooth, which was caused by the sea after the ice age.

== Mythology ==
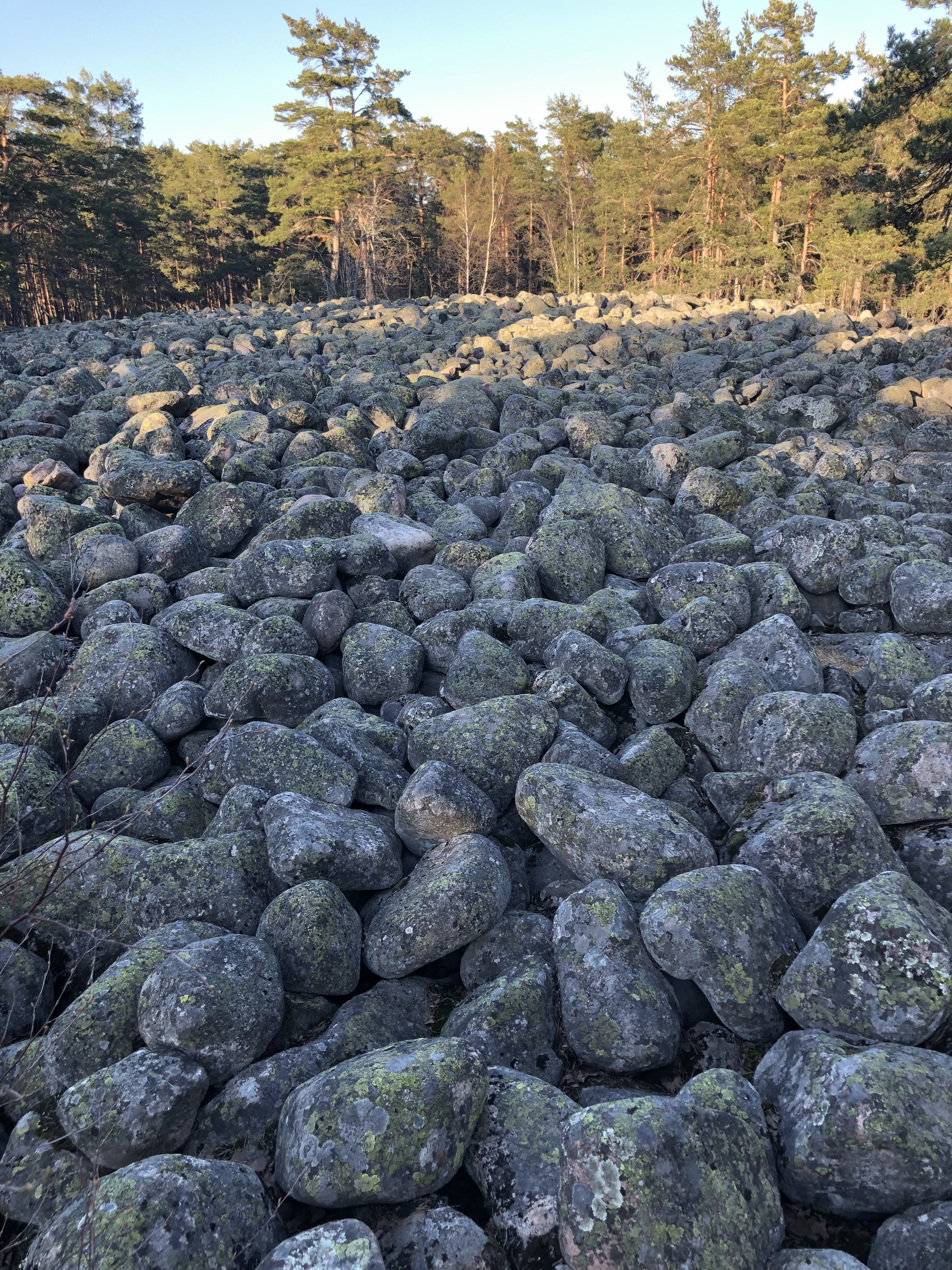
Pirunpelto

The word "nunna" comes from a dialectal word which means "giant", the same word can be found in may other places in Southwestern Finland, where it's associated with legends about giants. According to local folk stories, the giants that lived in Nunnavuori placed Pallivahankivi into its modern place. As local Finns believed that before the Finnish people arrived, the land was inhabited by a race of giants. Inside Nunnavuori a large pile of rocks can be located, in Finnish it is called "pirunpelto", meaning "the devil's field", which comes from a legend that the devil himself threw the rocks into the area. Finnish legends hold that the devil in his anger threw rocks all around forming large piles of rock.

== See also ==
- Piispanristi
- Pallivahankivi
- Cave of Luolavuori
