= Piispanristi =

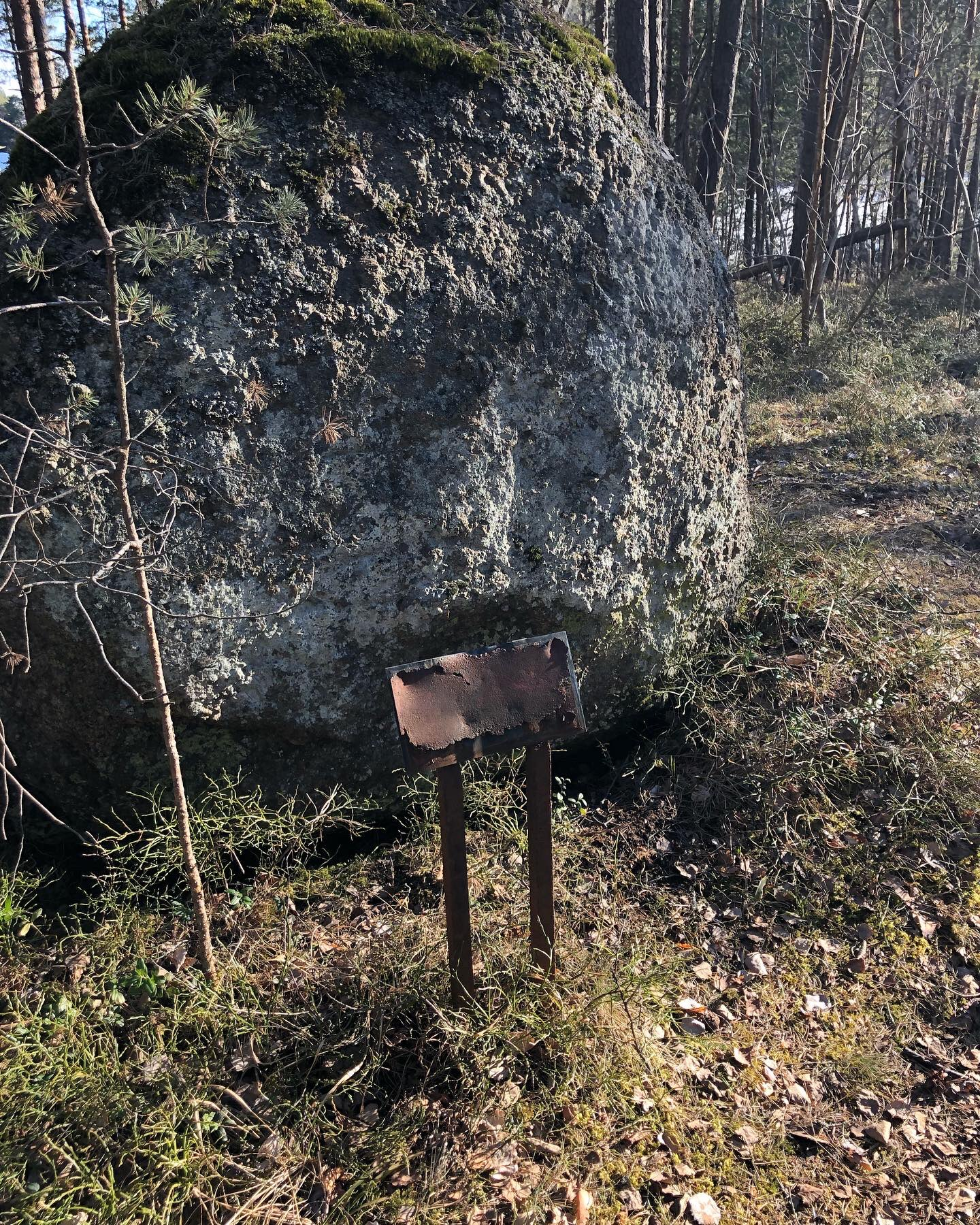
Piispanristinkivi

Piispanristi is a part of Kaarina which is close to the city of Turku, Finland.

== History ==
Piispanristi has been inhabited since the 13th century and is one of the oldest inhabited areas of Kaarina.

The whole area is named after a rock called Piispanristinkivi. The Rock has a cross engraved into it and is around 1.5 meters tall. According to tradition, the owner of the Kärki farm murdered and robbed the bishop of Turku when the bishop traveled from Kuusisto to Turku: On the way, the bishop became thirsty and visited the Kärki farm, where the children of the farm gave him water. The host then murdered and looted the bishop where the rock is today. The Bishop is possibly identified as Rodulff.

Other researchers however believe that the tradition actually originates from the murder of a servant of the bishop and not the bishop himself.

== See also ==
- Pallivahankivi
