= Grey Wolf: The Escape of Adolf Hitler =

2011 book and 2014 film

- Author: Gerrard Williams, Simon Dunstan
- Publication date: 2011
- ISBN: 9-781-45490304-8

Grey Wolf: The Escape of Adolf Hitler is a 2011 book by Gerrard Williams (1958–2022) and Simon Dunstan. In 2014, the book was adapted as a docudrama film, Grey Wolf: Hitler's Escape to Argentina, directed and written by Williams and produced by Magnus Peterson. The book and film allege that Hitler faked his death rather than dying in Berlin in 1945; both were given extensive coverage in the British media and criticised for their lack of verifiability.

== Plot ==
The book and film concern the allegations by its makers that Adolf Hitler did not die in his Berlin bunker on 30 April 1945 but escaped with his newlywed wife, Eva Braun, to Argentina, similar to claims made by the Soviet Union throughout mid-1945, interpreted by Western scholars as disinformation. Hitler is claimed to have been replaced by a double by the time of his last photographed appearances, although he is known not to have used political decoys during his lifetime. Nevertheless, it is claimed that Hitler and Braun's corpses were replaced by body doubles; this might agree with historical arguments stemming from Hitler's dental remains being all that were ever conclusively identified of either individual. (Note: Hitler's dental remains include part of a mandible with teeth sundered around the alveolar process.)

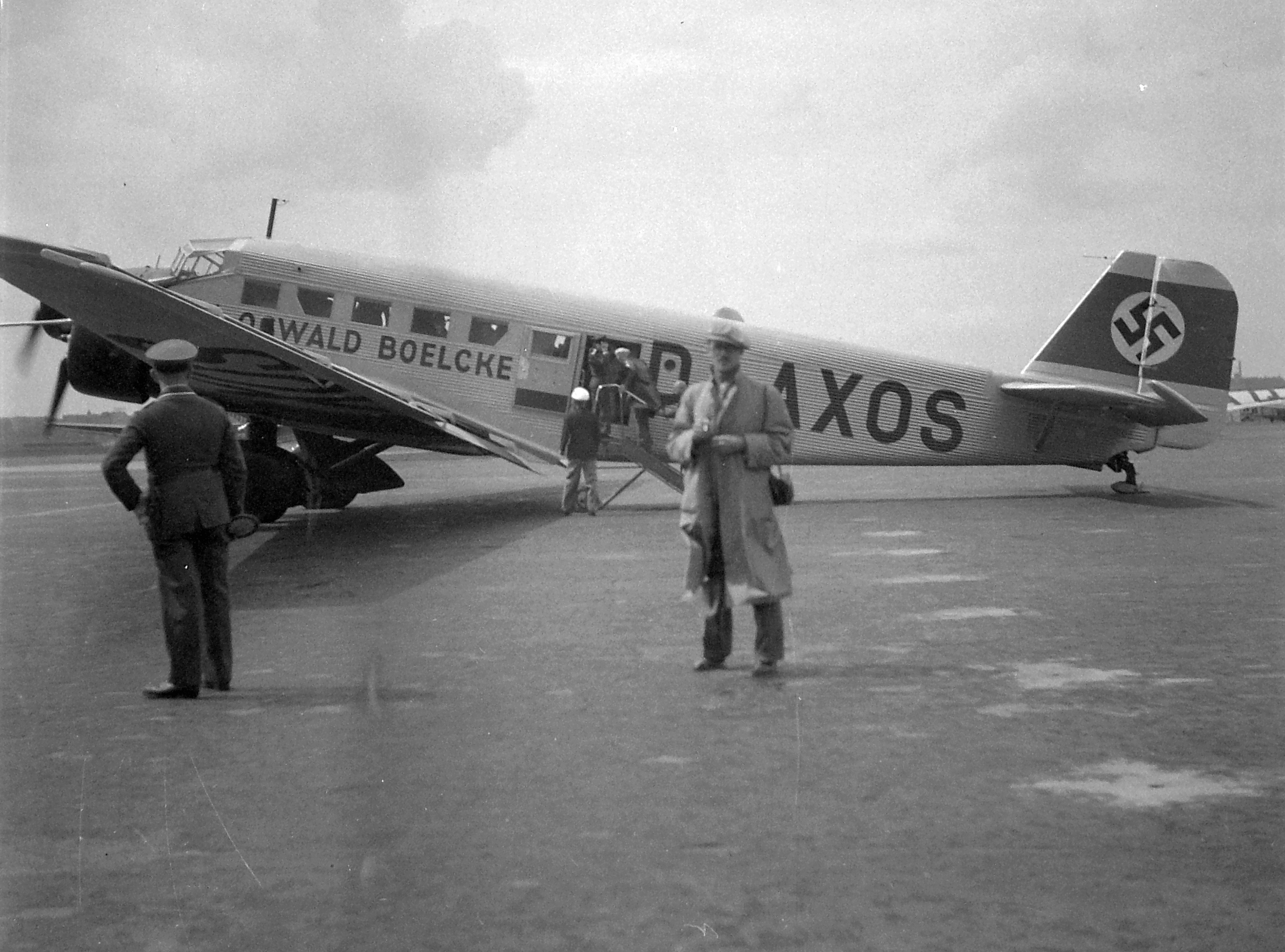
A Junkers Ju 52 is alleged to have helped Hitler to escape Berlin.

Besides many ranking Nazis confirmed to have fled to Argentina using the ratlines, others are alleged to have escaped with Hitler, including Martin Bormann and Braun's brother-in-law Hermann Fegelein. Fegelein was said to have been shot for desertion on 28 April 1945, but the book claims the court martial never took place. The same Junkers Ju 52 which Fegelein took to Berlin flew back to Rechlin, but allegedly returned around 28 April. Fegelein is speculated to have scouted a landing strip at Hohenzollerndamm, where Hitler and Braun might go after leaving the Führerbunker via escape tunnel. (Note: James P. O'Donnell cites pilot Hans Baur (whose Soviet captors accused of flying Hitler to safety before returning to Berlin to murder his alleged accomplice, pilot Georg Betz) as stating that a Ju 390, capable of long-distance flight, was on the ground in Rechlin.) Pilot Hanna Reitsch recalled that a Ju 52 landed in the Tiergarten on 27 April, but said it was sent back to Rechlin empty. The book cites Reitsch's 1970s claim that as she departed the Tiergarten early on 29 April, she saw a pilot "obviously waiting for someone" next to a Ju 52.

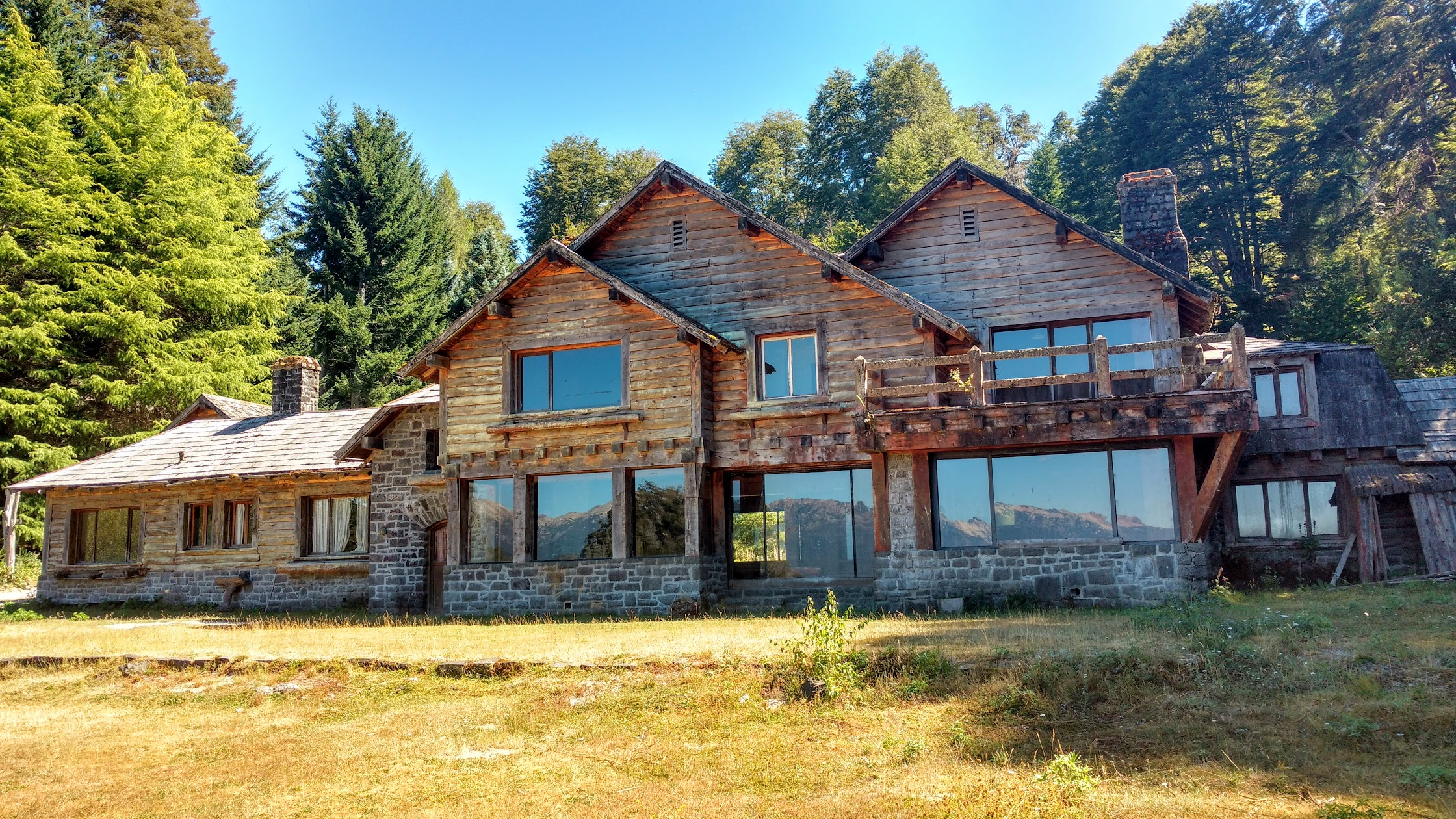
The Inalco House (near Bariloche), where Hitler allegedly lived after WWII

In South America, the escapees allegedly stayed first at a large ranch 29 kilometres (18 mi) from Bariloche and later lived 10 km (6 mi) east of Bariloche in a mansion overlooking Lake Nahuel Huapi that at the time was very remote and accessible only by boat or seaplane. Hitler allegedly met with Ante Pavelic and on multiple occasions visited Walter and Ida Eichorn, a German expatriate couple who had owned the Eden Hotel in La Falda prior to its seizure in 1945 (due to their pro-Nazi sympathies when Argentina declared war on Germany). According to the filmmakers, Hitler's escape was organized by Bormann, who posed as a businessman in Buenos Aires, aided and abetted by Juan Perón's government (which in fact supported the ratlines). Bormann supposedly used multiple aliases (including Daniel Dupree of Belgium) and lived in a suite in the Plaza Hotel with a German mistress. The book cites the CIA-reported claim of Dutch soldier Philip Citroën, who allegedly met Hitler around 1954 and provided a purported photograph of the two together.

In 1955, Perón was overthrown in a military coup and the new government began seriously investigating long-held rumors that Nazi war criminals were hiding in Argentina. In October of that year, Bormann allegedly moved Hitler to a chalet in an even more remote location 43 km (27 mi) from Bariloche and began to isolate him, to his chagrin. The film alleges that significant funds were taken from Germany to Argentina (later stolen by Bormann) and that U.S. intelligence agencies were aware that Hitler was in Argentina. The film alleges that Hitler died, deranged and destitute, in Argentina on February 13, 1962, at the age of 73 after a heart attack. His estranged wife, Eva, was reputed to be alive as of 2008 at age 96, with at least one child.

== Film ==
=== Cast ===
- Dante Venesio as Adolf Hitler
- Maria Heller as Eva Braun
- Pablo Castro as Hermann Fegelein
- Pietro Gian as Martin Bormann
- Edgardo Moreira as Ante Pavelic
- Alejandro Fain as Juan Peron

=== Production ===
The film was initially produced by two interrelated UK companies, Gerbil Films Ltd and Lobos Gris Ltd. Subsequent to filming, the rights to the film passed to a third company, Grey Wolf Media Ltd, who were responsible for its final release. The film was distributed worldwide by Australian Distributor Galloping Films. In May 2016, Grey Wolf Media Ltd was compulsorily wound up under the Companies Act 2006, and the rights to the film became Bona Vacantia. As such the ownership of the film rights passed to the UK Crown.

Grey Wolf was filmed in 2008 in Argentina, using local actors and many in the community as extras. Although produced by an English company, the film is mainly in Spanish with English subtitles.

=== Reception ===
The film was released straight to DVD in 2014 and was not therefore subject to significant critical film reviews. However, on Amazon UK, 42% of purchasers gave it a five star rating while 25% gave it a one star rating. On Amazon.com, 57% gave it a five star rating and 29% a one star rating.

The liquidators of Grey Wolf Media Limited described the film as "largely unsuccessful" in their May 2018 Progress Report and said that it generated revenues of only AUD$55,000 (about USD$39,000) and that much of this was paid in the form of guarantees by distributors rather than sales.

The year after the release of the DVD, the History Channel produced a TV series titled Hunting Hitler, in which they acclaimed co-author of the book Gerrard Williams as a reputable investigative journalist. The series, which aired from November 10, 2015, to January 23, 2018, in the US, allegedly documents numerous claims supporting the theory of Hitler's escape to South America.

== Controversies ==
The book and film concern one of many conspiracy theories about Hitler's death. Such viewpoints are regarded by historians and scientific experts as disproven fringe theories.

British historian Guy Walters described Dunstan and Williams' theory as "2,000 per cent rubbish" when the book was published. Walters added: "It's an absolute disgrace. There's no substance to it at all. It appeals to the deluded fantasies of conspiracy theorists and has no place whatsoever in historical research."

=== Weavering Capital ===
A significant controversy about the film relates to its funding and its link to the Weavering Capital scandal. Weavering Capital was a UK-based Hedge Fund Management Company that collapsed in 2009 after it was discovered that $600 million of investors' money had been lost, mainly due to bogus swap contracts created by its Managing Director, Magnus Peterson. Peterson was also the producer of the Grey Wolf film and along with Williams held significant financial interests in both Gerbil Films Ltd and Lobos Gris Ltd.

During efforts by the Official Receiver of Weavering Capital to recover the missing money, it was discovered that, in addition to the bogus swap contracts, Peterson had used investors' money without their permission to fund a number of personal projects including the Grey Wolf film. At least $1.3 million of investors' money was identified as having been spent on the film, although the Weavering Capital accounts showed an investment valued at $4.47 million. It was also discovered that, while acting fraudulently, Peterson had also taken $9 million in fees from Weavering Capital, and his wife, also a Weavering Director, $4.3 million and that during this period these two individuals also invested personally in the film through an investment vehicle they jointly owned called Magnumhold Ltd.

Following the collapse of Weavering Capital, both of the companies involved in the production of the film also collapsed. Lobos Gris Ltd was put into receivership in March 2010, leaving $345,000 of unpaid creditors. In August 2012, Gerbil Films was dissolved via compulsory strike-off. Its last published accounts showed $465,000 of unpaid creditors.

On the liquidation of Lobos Gris Ltd, the rights to the film were purchased by Grey Wolf Media Ltd, a new company mainly owned by Williams and Peterson. This purchase was again funded from Peterson's investment vehicle, Magnumhold Ltd, in the form of share capital and loans to Grey Wolf Media and its director which totalled $294,000 by March 2011 Ltd, while the December 2015 liquidators' report shows an investment with an alleged value of $737,000.

At a civil trial in 2012, Peterson, his wife and two other directors were found liable for the losses at Weavering Capital and ordered to pay $450 million in damages, making them effectively bankrupt and leading to the liquidation of Magnumhold Ltd. In a 2015 criminal trial, Magnus Peterson was found guilty of 8 charges of fraud and related offences in relation to his role as Managing Director of Weavering Capital and sentenced to 13 years in prison.

As of December 2015, the liquidators are still trying to recover funds spent on the film by Peterson via both Weavering and Magnumhold. However, on 24 May 2016, Grey Wolf Media Ltd was compulsorily wound up under the Companies Act 2016 as no accounts had been filed for over two years. The last published accounts (2014) showed debts of $267,000. In total, the 3 companies making the film (Gerbil Films, Lobos Gris & Grey Wolf Media) recorded unpaid debts to creditors of $1.08 million.

While the total amount spent is unclear, investigative journalist Laurence de Mello believes the figure to be in excess of $2 million but also alleges that there were a number of issues with the project's accounting and governance. The film's Australian distributor lists the budget as $2.3 million.

=== Ricardo D'Aloia ===
In 2011, the film and book were hit by a second scandal when Ricardo D'Aloia, editorial director of Ambito Financiero, took issue with some of the claims made by the authors and producers. In both the book and promotional material for the film, it was stated in reference to eyewitness accounts of Hitler being in Argentina that "It is the words of these witnesses, on a tape given to us by the papers' editorial director Ricardo D'Aloia that have contributed to the findings in this book." D'Aloia wrote to the publishers: "in order to clarify the fact that the statement is not at all true" and went on to say, "I hope you will understand that I do not appreciate in any way having been named in your publication, and so involved in such a unpleasant episode with which I have absolutely no relation".

=== Abel Basti ===
In 2013, the film was hit by a further scandal when Abel Basti, an Argentine journalist, alleged that the Grey Wolf film and book had plagiarised his work and began legal action for compensation. Basti had previously published the book Bariloche Nazi-guía Turística in 2004, where he claimed Hitler and Braun lived in the surroundings of Bariloche for many years after World War II, also mentioning the Inalco House as Hitler's refuge.

== See also ==
- Department 50 – Chilean-FBI probe of Nazis in South America
