= Department 50 =

Chilean-FBI probe of Nazis in South America

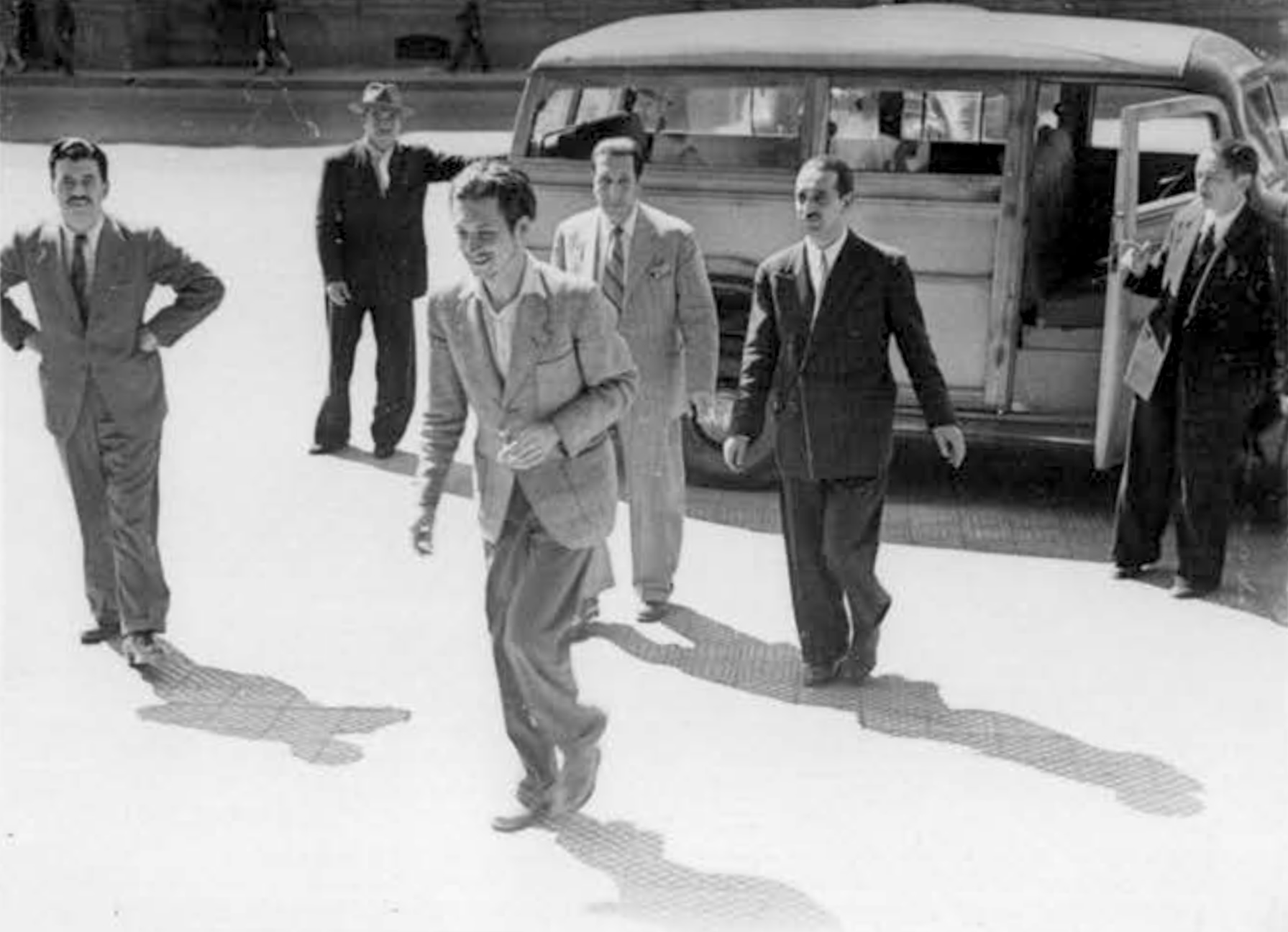
Potential undercover agents and Nazi supporters, possibly including Argentine statesman Juan Perón (center)

Department 50 (also known as Departamento 50 or the International Confidential Section) was a unit of the civilian police of Chile that investigated Nazi activity from 1941 to 1947. The United States Federal Bureau of Investigation (FBI) provided the unit with intelligence about Nazi interest in South America during World War II and helped it thwart local Nazi spy rings. In its later years, Chile's probe expanded more broadly to Latin America, including Argentina's capital, Buenos Aires, where Axis espionage operations were based.

Numerous photographs and other documents were declassified in 2017 and subsequently suggested by History's investigative documentary series Hunting Hitler to align with the fringe theory that the dictator escaped Berlin amid the wider postwar Nazi migration to South America.

== Overview ==
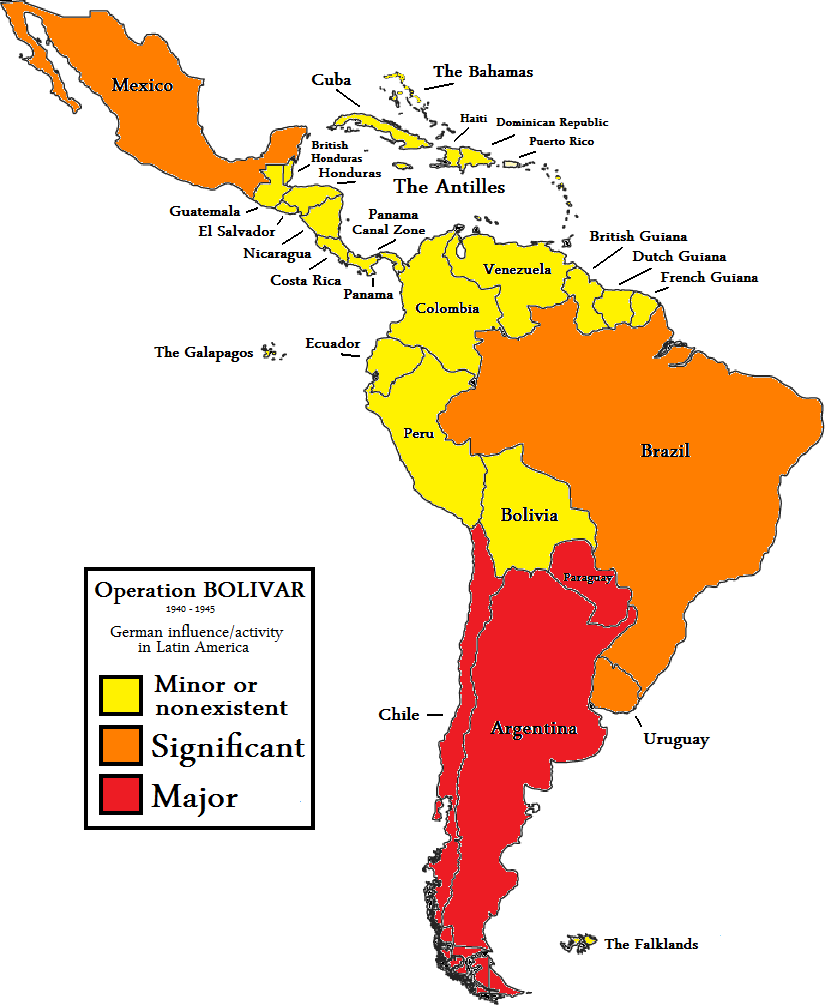
Nazi influence in Latin America during World War II

As early as 1937, Nazi spy networks operated in Chile, which the Chilean Navy discovered via radio (perhaps in 1939). In 1941, the director general of the Investigations Police of Chile established Departamento 50 (a reference to the annex's telephone extension), also called the International Confidential Section, to investigate pro-Nazi activity in the area during World War II. The department had the support of the United States Federal Bureau of Investigation's wartime Special Intelligence Service.

By mid-1940, the FBI had become aware that Nazi spies in the US had lines of communication with those in South America. By 1942, the bureau knew that the Nazis planned to advance into the southern continent. The FBI learned that a large fleet of German submarines was slated to transport Nazi forces to the coasts of Colombia and Venezuela, with U-boats reportedly refueling off the coast of Argentina. The FBI shared intelligence with a number of South American governments, including Argentina and Chile, which had not yet broken with the Axis powers. In late 1942, the FBI alerted the Chilean Ministry of Foreign Affairs of a Nazi spy radio transmitting from Valparaíso. Learning that the Nazis planned to attack Chilean communications and the Allies' access to copper and nitrate mines, Department 50 dismantled the network. In late 1944, FBI director J. Edgar Hoover wrote an article explaining the bureau's support.

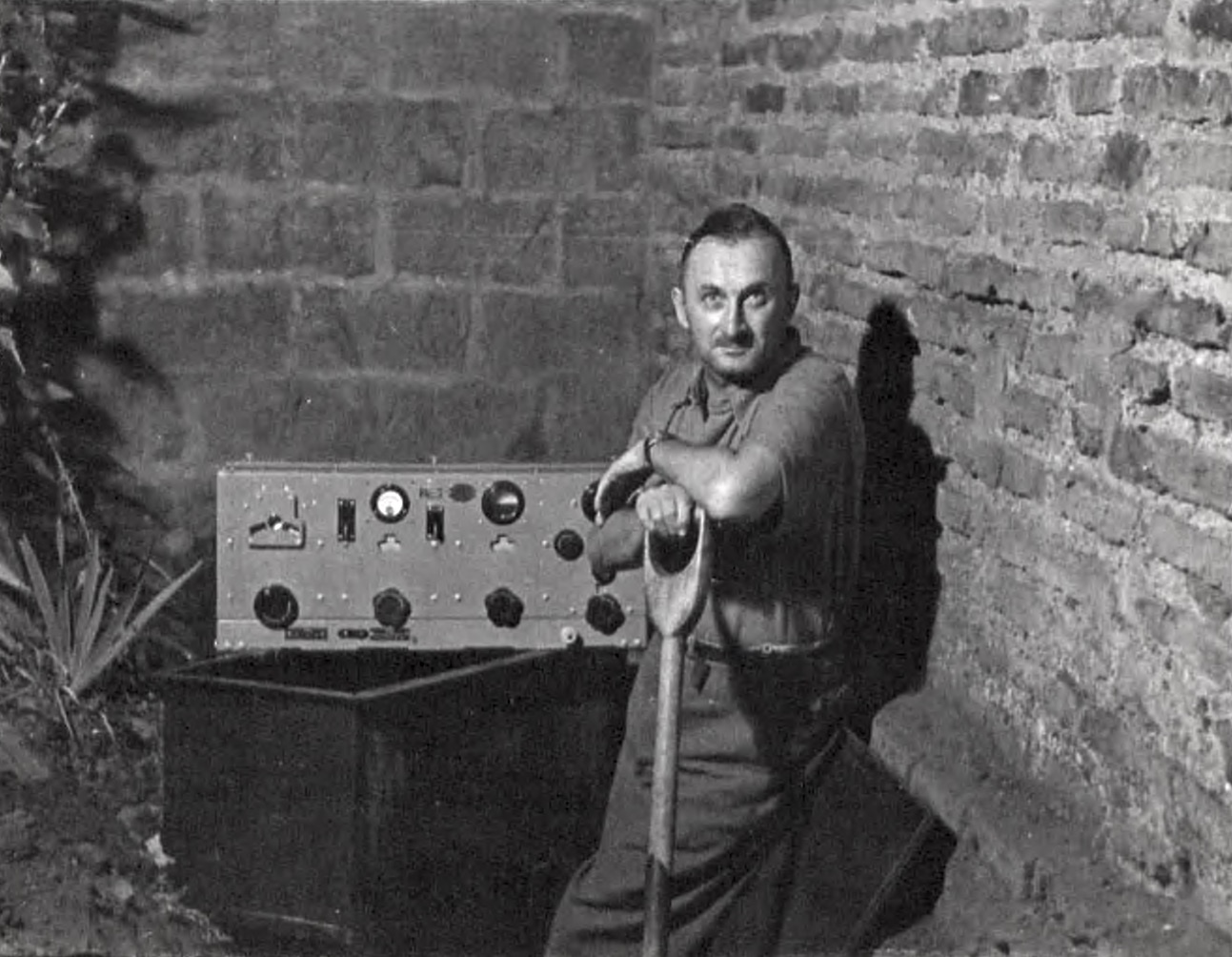
An apprehended collaborator from the second spy ring unearths a radio used to contact Germany.

Department 50 broke up a second spy ring in 1944. Some Nazi agents attempted to flee to other countries, but due to Argentina severing ties with the Axis late in the war, many opted to remain in Chile. The Nazis captured intelligence regarding the routes of Allied merchant ships. About 100 spies were arrested in the 1944 raid, including coordinator Bernardo Timmermann, at whose residence was found a list of several hundred Nazi sympathizers. The spies reportedly received their orders from German High Command and the Axis espionage operations center, the latter jointly located at the German embassies in Chile's capital, Santiago, and Argentina's capital, Buenos Aires. Perhaps 7,000 Axis sympathizers were identified.

=== Expansion into Latin America ===
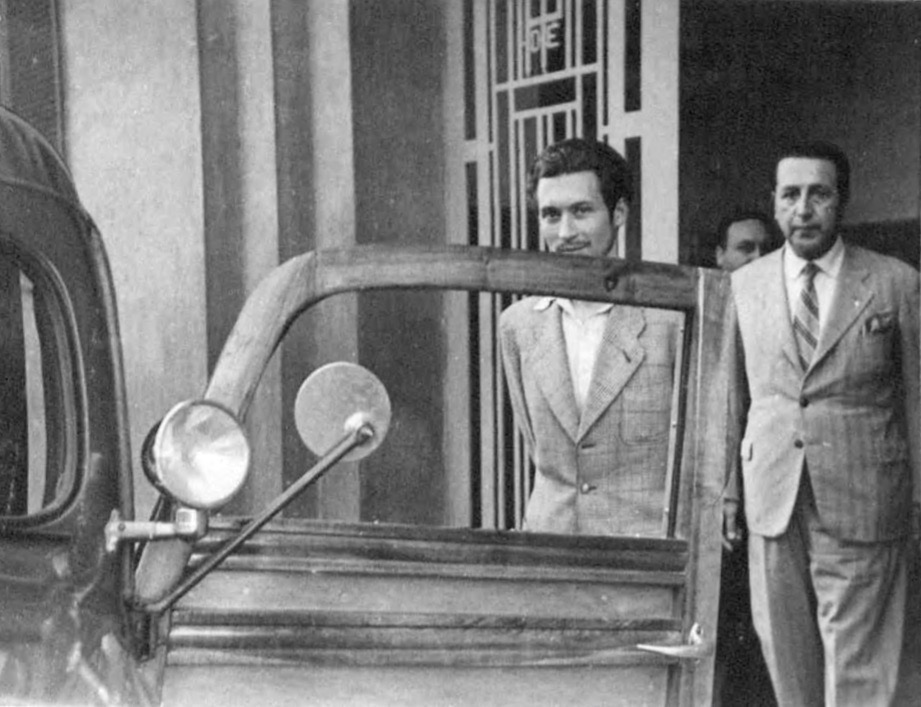
Counterespionage photo possibly showing Argentine statesman Juan Perón (Note: The building resembles some Buenos Aires sites, namely an addendum to the Plaza Hotel.)

Due to the counterespionage effort, the center of Axis espionage operations shifted fully to Buenos Aires, where a diplomatic pouch was used; (Note: In 1943, SS functionary Walter Schellenberg agreed to use such a pouch to pay the Argentine military to shield escaped Nazis. $200 million in gold was allegedly used to bribe Juan Perón's government.) some captured spies disclosed details of agents operating in that city. Subsequently, merchant marine captain Albert von Appen was arrested. Based in Chile, he headed Latin America's Nazi espionage network (likely tied to the Abwehr) and had planned strategic sabotages, including of the Panama Canal and within countries entering the war.

In its final outing, Chile was joined by other governments in probing Nazi activity throughout Latin America, which it also detected in the coastal cities of Montevideo (Uruguay), São Paulo (Brazil), and Lima (Peru). Nazi espionage networks were dismantled in Argentina, Brazil, Colombia, and Venezuela. The department then largely disbanded, although its final activity was reportedly carried out in 1947.

Some counterespionage photos were taken, with most subjects demonstrating no awareness of a camera—possibly implying that hidden devices were utilized.

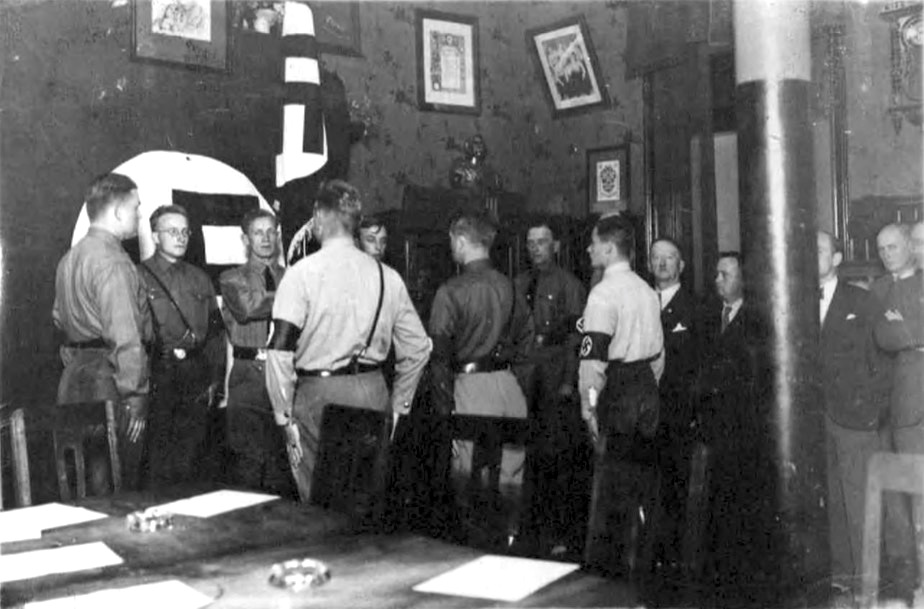
Background left: possibly Philip Citroën and U-530's captain, amongst some uniformed Nazis

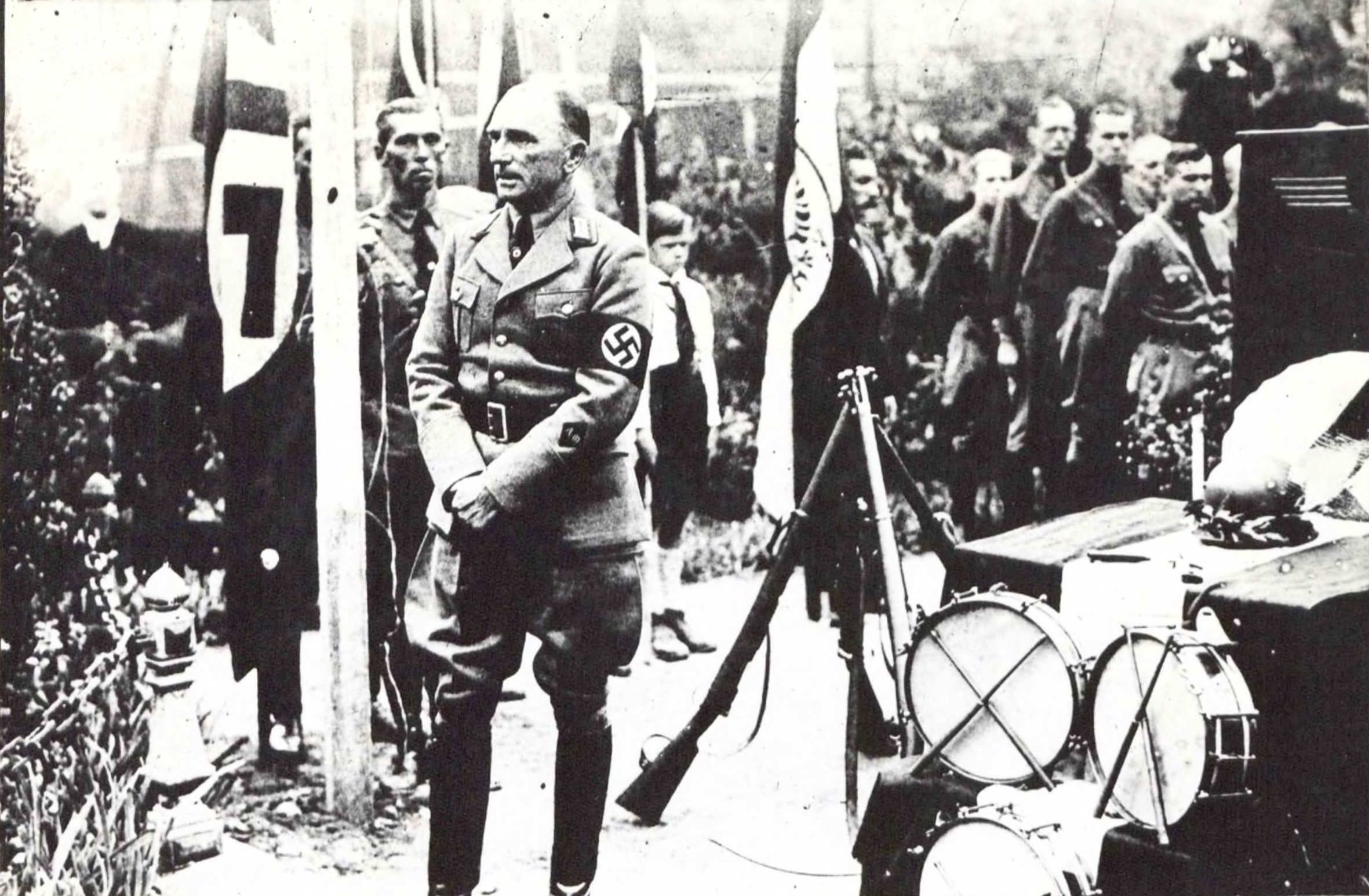
A jacketed Nazi of rank turned away from men at attention

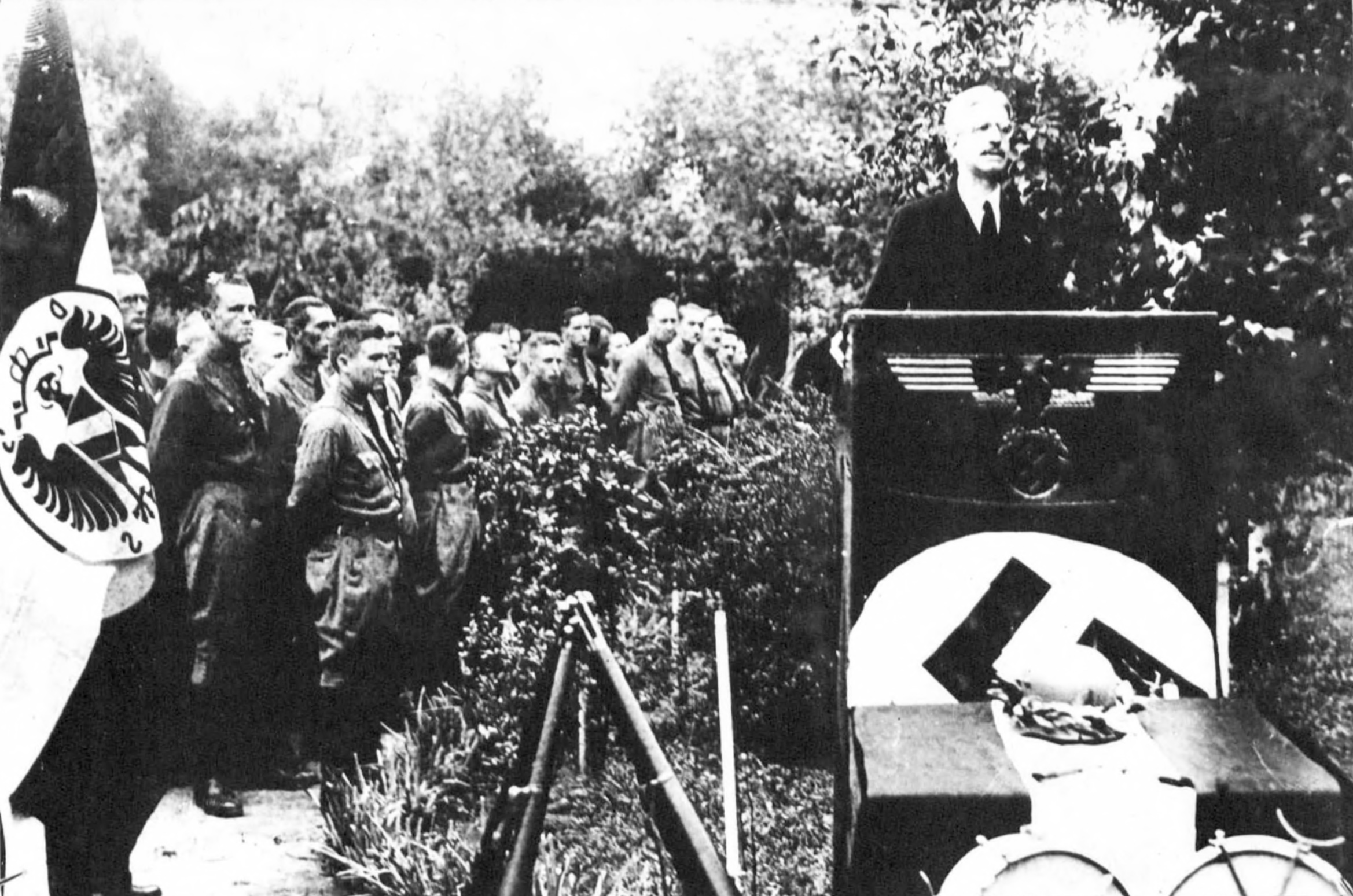
An assembly flanked by a flag of a shielded eagle/phoenix, with segments near the beak

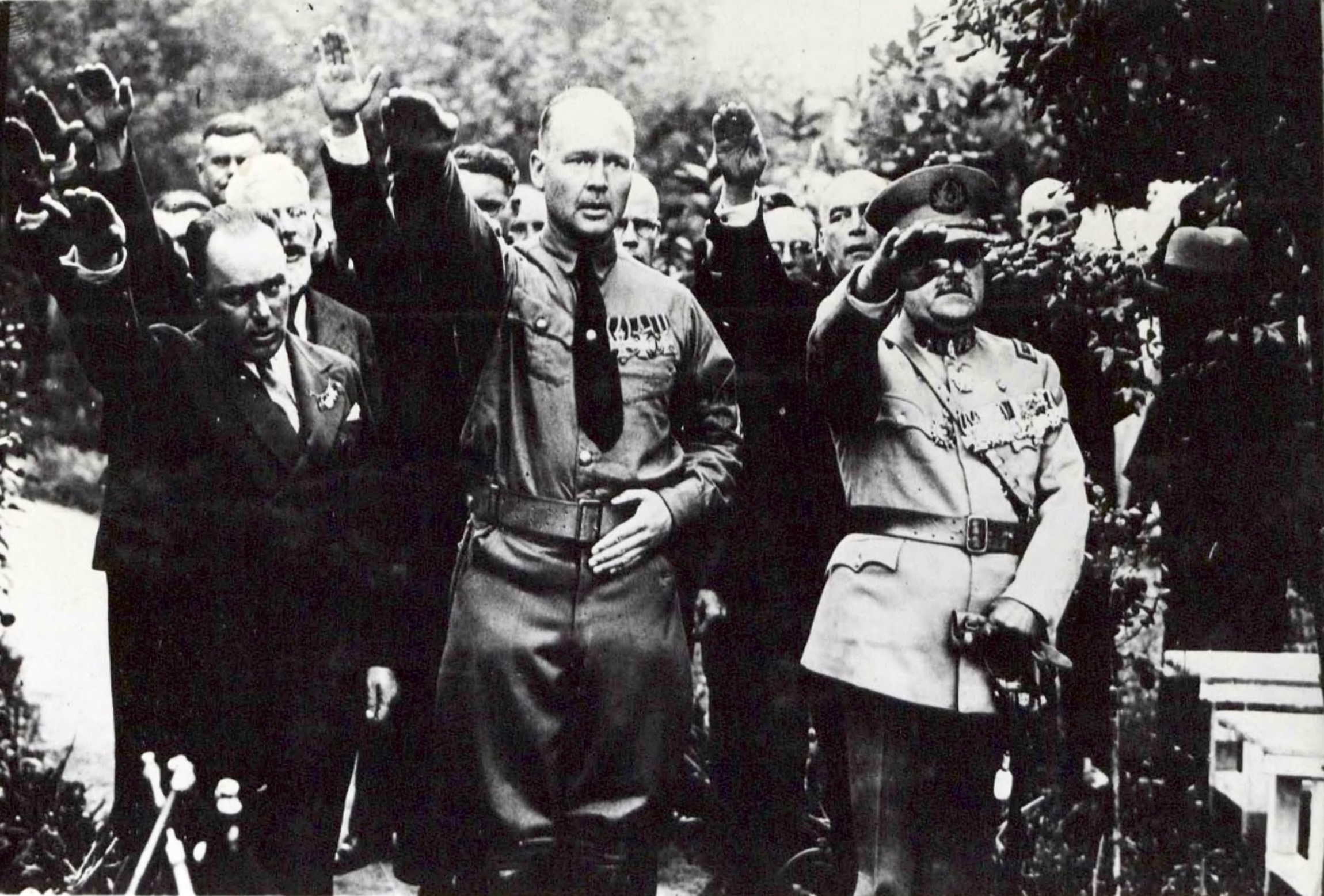
A decorated man with a small toothbrush moustache (center) giving a Nazi salute

== Legacy ==
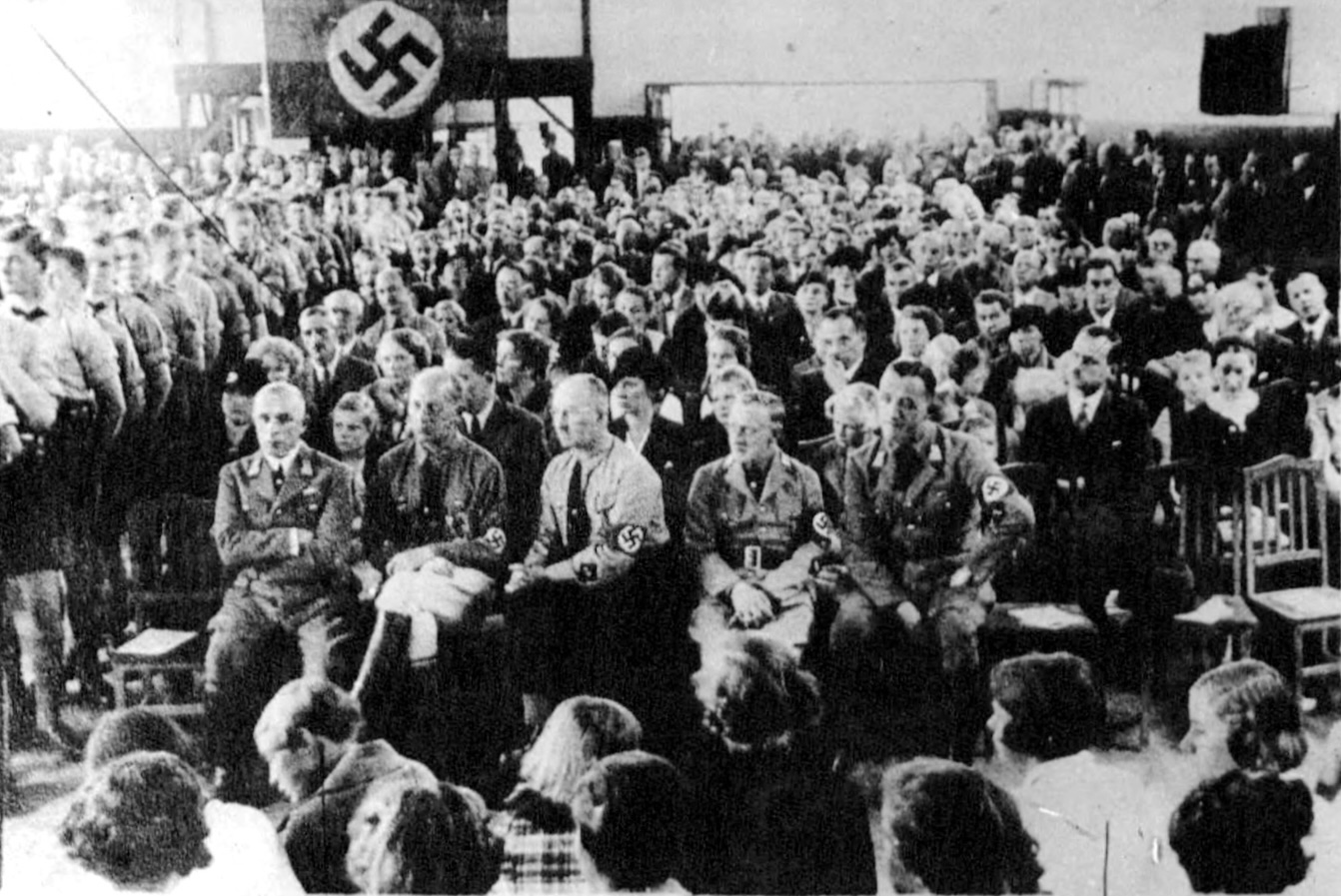
This photograph, showing a sizable Nazi conference with women and children, including Hitler Youth boys and girls, was shown in the final episode of Hunting Hitler.

J. Edgar Hoover of the FBI hailed the department's work as contributing to the defense of the Western Hemisphere against the Nazi regime.

On 22 June 2017, the police declassified 80 folders of records from the investigation and turned them over to the National Archives of Chile. Chilean politician Gabriel Silber stated that previously "this was a state secret," and that "unfortunately some political and business figures in Chile supported the Nazis." The digitized collection includes 26 files containing thousands of pages and over 200 photographs (mostly in one file).

In 2018, History's investigative documentary series Hunting Hitler (which alleges the dictator's secret escape from Berlin) visited the archives, were shown the counterespionage photos, and learned of an alleged network of over 750 outposts resembling Chile's Nazi-tied Colonia Dignidad. The show's hosts implied the activity to evidence a Fourth Reich.

== See also ==
- Nazi War Crimes Disclosure Act – American government interagency group
- Operation Paperclip – Secret post-WWII United States program
