= Hunting Hitler =

American television series

- Teaser poster for the first season
- Genre: Reality
- Directed by: Jeffrey R. Daniels; Clint Lealos
- Narrated by: Dave Hoffman
- Country of origin: United States
- Original language: English
- No. of seasons: 3
- No. of episodes: 24 (+2 bonus episodes and 1 special)

Production
- Running time: 42 minutes
- Production company: Karga 7 Pictures

Original release
- Network: History Channel
- Release: November 10, 2015 – February 19, 2018

Hunting Hitler is a History Channel television series based on the fringe theory that Adolf Hitler escaped from Berlin at the end of World War II in Europe, ostensibly by faking his death instead of committing suicide in Berlin in 1945. The show was conceived after the 2010s declassification of documents related to official investigations of this possibility.

The series explores how Hitler might have escaped, where he might have gone, and whether he plotted a Fourth Reich. The series ran for three seasons between 2015 and 2018, followed by a two-hour special in 2020.

== Series overview ==
The show was conceived following the 21st-century declassification of government documents exploring the premise that Hitler might not have died in April 1945.

The show was hosted in Los Angeles by Central Intelligence Agency (CIA) veteran Bob Baer and former international war crimes investigator John Cencich. Utilizing a database of intelligence files from the Federal Bureau of Investigation (FBI), CIA, MI6, and other international agencies, they look for information regarding the possible survival of Adolf Hitler or any other high-ranking Nazis, including plans for a Fourth Reich. The ground teams search for evidence supporting these leads. According to the show's creators, similar man-hunting techniques are employed as were used by the CIA to find Saddam Hussein and Osama bin Laden.

Season	Episodes	Originally aired	
Season	Episodes	Season premiere	Season finale
1	8	November 10, 2015	December 29, 2015
2	8	November 15, 2016	January 3, 2017
3	8	January 2, 2018	February 20, 2018
Special	1	November 11, 2020	

== Investigative team ==
- Bob Baer — Former CIA Operative
- Dr. John Cencich — Former international war crimes investigator, professor, and criminologist
- Nada Bakos — Former terrorist-targeting officer
- Tim Kennedy — U.S. Army Special Forces operator and former MMA fighter
- James Holland — WWII historian
- Mike Simpson — Medical doctor, airborne ranger, and special forces operator
- Gerrard Williams — Investigative journalist and historian
- Lenny DePaul — Former U.S. Marshals commander
- Steve Rambam — Private investigator and Nazi hunter

== Episodes ==
=== Season 1 (2015) ===
No. overall	No. in season	Title	Original release date	Viewers (millions)
1	1	"The Hunt Begins"	November 10, 2015	N/A
CIA veteran Bob Baer and war crimes investigator Dr. John Cencich begin investigating what might have happened to Adolf Hitler at the end of WWII if he had survived. An FBI report places Hitler residing in a small Nazi-connected town in Argentina over three months after he was believed dead.
2	2	"Secret Nazi Lair"	November 17, 2015	N/A
Tim Kennedy, US Army Special Forces, joins archeologists Philip Kiernan and Daniel Schavelzon to explore a mysterious Nazi complex in the jungles of Argentina. They discover Nazi artifacts at the three-building site, as well as evidence of an opulent German residence. In response to the revelation that a skull fragment with gun damage—long thought to belong to Hitler—may instead belong to a female, an attempt is made to contact Eva Braun's only living relative to see if her DNA is a match.
3	3	"Escape From Berlin"	November 24, 2015	N/A
Prominent death claims investigator Steven Rambam and Nazi profiler and historian Gerrard Williams join Tim Kennedy to investigate a site that the FBI reported Hitler used to disembark from a U-boat in Argentina. Former US Marshal Lenny DePaul uncovers an escape route from Hitler's bunker in Berlin to the nearby Tempelhof Airport, where multiple Nazi airplanes fled the Battle of Berlin.
4	4	"The Tunnel"	December 1, 2015	N/A
Lenny DePaul and Sascha Keil find a never before discovered tunnel leading from Hitler's bunker directly to Tempelhof Airport. Kennedy joins a team of elite marine archeologists to search for a possible German U-boat off the coast of Argentina. DePaul joins Gerrard Williams to investigate if Hitler could have been concealed in Spain with the help of Spanish dictator Francisco Franco.
5	5	"Ratlines"	December 8, 2015	N/A
In Spain, DePaul and Williams investigate a monastery that could have been a Nazi hideout and meet an eyewitness who claims Hitler once lived there. Further investigation leads the team to a German plane landing and nearby Nazi communication devices. Kennedy investigates the possibility of a sunken U-boat off the coast of Argentina. The team is led to the Canary Islands, where they learn of a possible Enigma machine and tunnels used to supply U-boats with torpedoes.
6	6	"Hitler's Safehouse"	December 15, 2015	N/A
In the Canary Islands, DePaul and Williams uncover secret tunnels and a large German compound which may have supplied Hitler's potential escape to South America. Kennedy infiltrates a German town in Argentina known for sheltering Nazis after the war. Williams locates an isolated lakeside mansion that could have housed Hitler.
7	7	"Friends in High Places"	December 22, 2015	N/A
The team investigates a now-defunct resort which a close confidant of Hitler's once operated. They discover an eyewitness placing Hitler at the location. Kennedy and Williams travel to a small coastal town in Brazil, where Hitler reportedly attended a ballet performance.
8	8	"Hitler's Plane"	December 29, 2015	N/A
An FBI report places Hitler landing a plane in Colombia. Baer and Cencich identify a marsh where they believe this plane was hidden, and the team gains unprecedented access to the protected site to use side-scan sonar to carry out their search.

=== Season 2 (2016–2017) ===
No. overall	No. in season	Title	Original release date	Viewers (millions)
9	0	"Inside the Investigation"	November 1, 2016	N/A
The evidence from the first season is summarized, along with a preview of Season 2.
10	1	"The Hunt Continues"	November 15, 2016	N/A
Lenny DePaul and Sascha Keil discover an unknown fifth exit from the Führerbunker and begin investigating areas that could have served as a makeshift runway out of Berlin. Meanwhile, Tim Kennedy and historical archaeologist Alasdair Brooks reunite with Daniel Schavelzon at the mysterious Nazi lair in Misiones, Argentina. There, they discover a new building that could be a military compound.
11	2	"The Compound"	November 22, 2016	N/A
Intelligence reports indicate that Hitler would have taken a short-range plane from Berlin to Denmark. DePaul and James Holland head there and investigate an airstrip and a massive bunker system. In Misiones, Kennedy and Brooks unearth clues that the site could be that of a militarized Nazi compound.
12	3	"Eyewitness Accounts"	November 29, 2016	N/A
A declassified document reveals that Hitler and a close associate, Leon Degrelle, could have moved from Denmark to San Sebastian, Spain. There, James Holland and Mike Simpson discover several eyewitnesses, a satellite of the Third Reich, and what could be a Nazi communications center. The team in Misiones speaks with a living relative of Hermann Göring and a man who claims his father worked for Martin Bormann (believed to have died in 1945) after the end of the war.
13	4	"The Web"	December 6, 2016	N/A
While following leads on a Nazi escape network, the teams in Southern Spain and Northern Argentina both make discoveries of vast tunnel systems in the mountains.
14	5	"The Factory"	December 13, 2016	N/A
Baer and Cencich continue to investigate leads in Spain, Morocco, and Argentina. The teams look into Hitler's possible escape route while uncovering a plan for a Fourth Reich.
15	6	"The Secret Island"	December 20, 2016	N/A
Digging deeper into reports about the Fourth Reich, Baer and Cencich send the team to a rumored weapons testing site in Germany, and a mysterious deserted island in Argentina that could have housed nuclear facilities with Nazi ties after the war.
16	7	"Unmarked Grave"	December 27, 2016	N/A
Baer and Cencich send their teams into Chile and Paraguay to investigate Hitler's whereabouts on the basis of his being forced to flee Argentina following Juan Perón's overthrow in 1955. In Chile, Kennedy and Williams meet the adopted daughter of a man locally believed to have been Bormann. They are shown his grave and note that the soil type seems to match red clay found on Bormann's remains, discovered buried in Berlin in 1972 and held by Germany until his DNA was confirmed in 1998. The remains were cremated by the family with no soil test.
17	8	"Nazi Colony"	January 3, 2017	N/A
Kennedy and Simpson investigate a secretive German community in Chile, formerly known as Colonia Dignidad, with reported Nazi ties. Inside the compound they find clues pointing to the potential formation of a Fourth Reich.

=== Season 3 (2017–2018) ===
No. overall	No. in season	Title	Original release date	Viewers (millions)
18	0	"Anatomy of a Manhunt"	December 26, 2017	N/A
Baer and his team provide an inside look at their investigation, summarizing the evidence from the past two seasons. Along with previews of Season 3, they explain their strategies.
19	1	"The Final Hunt Begins"	January 2, 2018	N/A
Baer recruits prominent terrorist targeting officer Nada Bakos. Enacting the hunting strategy which led to the capture of Osama bin Laden, the team finds two planned escape routes for Hitler out of Germany. To the south, Kennedy and Holland discover a tunnel system under Hitler's home. To the north, DePaul and Williams investigate a hidden Nazi compound.
20	2	"Clandestine Cache"	January 9, 2018	N/A
DePaul and Williams make a startling discovery in a sabotaged aircraft hangar in northern Germany. Simpson and Holland scan an Austrian lake in search for a large cache of secret Nazi documents.
21	3	"Nuclear Nazi Weapons"	January 16, 2018	N/A
In Norway, Kennedy and Williams explore a hydroelectric plant where the Nazis were dangerously close to producing a nuclear weapon. Simpson and Holland investigate a cabin high in the Austrian Alps where Hitler's top associate made the ultimate sacrifice.
22	4	"150 Feet Below"	January 23, 2018	N/A
At the bottom of an Arctic fjord in Norway, Kennedy dives on Nazi relics that may blow the case wide open. Simpson and Holland encounter a smuggler who leads them to Nazi castle on the Italian border.
23	5	"Dead Drops"	January 30, 2018	N/A
Simpson and Holland excavate the grounds of a remote Alpine hotel in search of buried Nazi dead drops. In Rome, DePaul and Williams make a shocking discovery that implicates some of the world’s most powerful people.
24	6	"Lurking Beneath the Surface"	February 6, 2018	1.65
At a lagoon in Uruguay, Kennedy and Simpson uncover evidence of a long-range seaplane that was shuttling Nazis all around the continent. In Buenos Aires, Kennedy and Williams convince an informant to share a massive cache of explosive documents that could unravel the clandestine global Nazi network known as Die Spinne.
25	7	"Target: United States"	February 13, 2018	N/A
On the trail of Josef Mengele, Kennedy and Simpson investigate a key Nazi support point in Uruguay: the Rincón del Bonete dam, which may have been intended to produce heavy water. Kennedy and Williams follow rumors that Hitler went from Misiones to a jungle hideout outside the Nazi-aligned Colonia Independencia in Paraguay. A local German claims that decades earlier, he saw Hitler wearing a full mustache and old military garb at a jungle compound built in the 1930s. Only accessible via a road passing by an apparent guard structure, Kennedy finds evidence of a cliffside lookout providing an expansive view over the massive property.
26	8	"Hitler's Last Will"	February 20, 2018	N/A
At the National Archives of Chile, Simpson and DePaul are shown extensive photography documenting Nazism in Chile and learn of an alleged network of over 700 outposts resembling Colonia Dignidad; they visit an apparent concentration camp ostensibly run by Walter Rauff. An anonymous source shows them microfilm of Hitler's last will and testament, indicating that not all of its copies were captured by the Allies. Baer presents his hypothesis of Hitler's escape route to a retired FBI agent, who opines that it would be enough to reopen the cold case.

=== Special (2020) ===
No. overall	No. in season	Title	Original release date	Viewers (millions)
27	1	"The Final Chapter"	November 11, 2020	N/A
Baer outlines the alleged Fourth Reich's plan for world domination using sleeper cells in the Americas. A Nazi triple agent evidently subverted the FBI while other Nazis developed nuclear weapons. They could have planned to use a A9/A10 Amerika Rakete to destroy Manhattan from Colombia, a country less antagonistic to Nazism c. 1948 due to destabilization following Jorge Eliécer Gaitán's assassination. However, the Cold War may have influenced the Nazis to wait for the United States and the Soviet Union to weaken one another, creating a power vacuum the Nazis would benefit from. Apparent Nazi supporter George de Mohrenschildt is theorized to have coached Lee Harvey Oswald in the assassination of John F. Kennedy in hopes of triggering World War III (presumably causing a nuclear holocaust in most of the Northern Hemisphere).

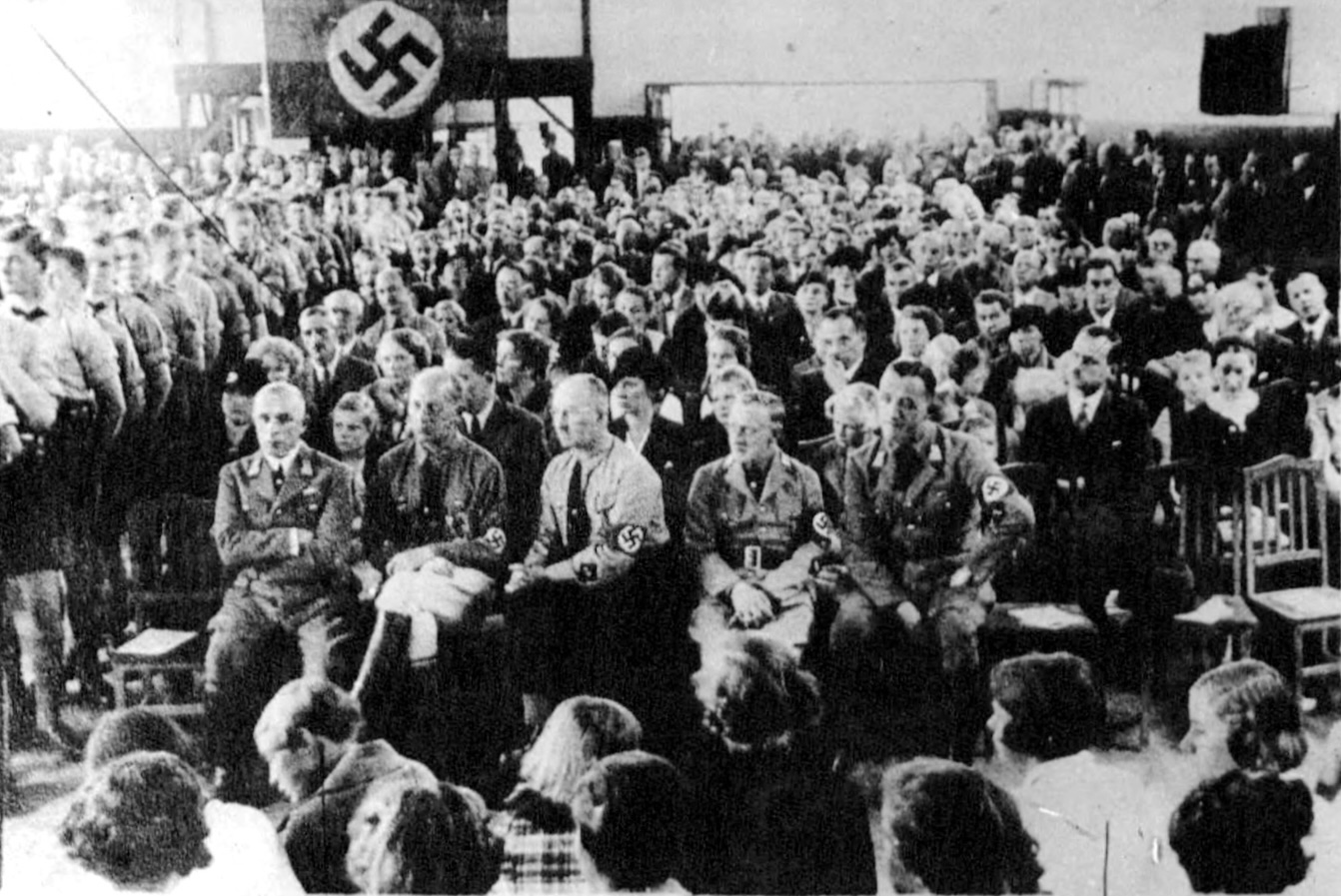
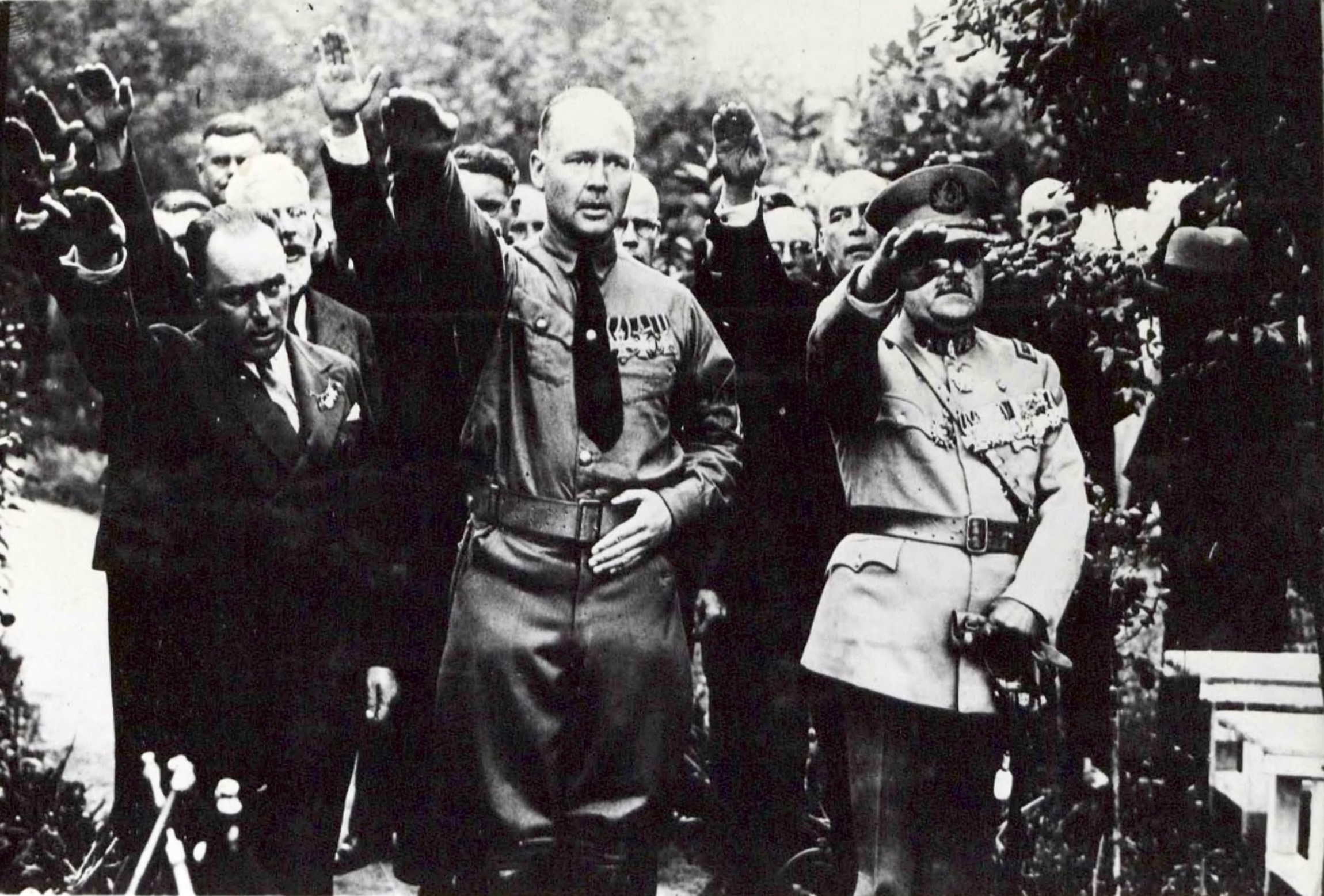
The last episode briefly showed these photographs of a Nazi assembly and a toothbrush mustachioed chieftain performing a Hitleresque salute in Latin America c. 1945–1947 (from Chile's anti-Nazi investigation)

== Reception ==
The show has been criticized by various media outlets. Brian Lowry wrote for Variety, "Seriously, guys, what's next, 'Hitlernado?'" Lowry wrote for CNN that "in a year when 'fake news' received so much attention, History is willingly promoting bad history – filled with unsubstantiated theories and speculation". Tom Conroy wrote for Media Life Magazine that "One gets the impression that [the series] will continue to spin its wheels for the duration. But even if it unearths evidence of Hitler's survival, there's no way the government would let that information out." Contrarily, the National Police Gazette, an American tabloid-style magazine and longtime supporter of the Hitler-escape narrative, wrote positively of the series' presentation.

== Legacy ==
On May 17, 2018, popular podcast host Joe Rogan interviewed Tim Kennedy on his show; they discussed the series and its premise, including its focus on the Nazi escape routes to South America known as "ratlines". Kennedy argued that the series is unlike the History Channel's pseudoscientific series Ancient Aliens and that Hitler indeed escaped to the Americas. Kennedy proclaimed, "The way history is written is wrong."

In 2019, series host Bob Baer stated that he actually agreed with the mainstream view that Hitler died in Berlin in April 1945, but that "there's no doubt" the dictator intended to carry out his agenda in South America. The subsequent Hunting Hitler closing special focuses on the potential Fourth Reich.

In 2020, team member and author James Holland tweeted that "I was certainly interested in learning more about how Nazis escaped, but was very careful never to mention on film that I thought either Hitler or Bormann escaped. Because they didn't." In 2021, he further derided the series on his podcast, calling it "absolute nonsense". Historian Richard J. Evans similarly dismissed all Hitler survival stories as "fantasies".

On April 20, 2025, Baer stated that he now viewed the investigation as having uncovered evidence of Hitler's survival, speculating that it would be supported by the declassification of an Argentine archive. Amongst other details, those files revealed that the Nazis may have bribed Perón's government with $200 million in gold to support their escape and resettlement effort.

== See also ==
- Faked death
- Grey Wolf: The Escape of Adolf Hitler – 2011 book and 2014 film claiming Hitler died in South America
- Philip Citroën – Claimed witness of Hitler's survival
