= Philip Citroën =

Claimed witness of Hitler's survival

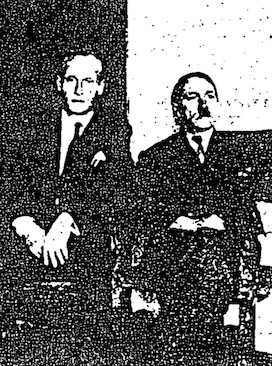
Microfilm of a purported photograph showing Citroën with Adolf Hitler in Colombia in 1954, (Note: The left background in Abel Basti's alleged original print is slightly darker than the skin tone(s), with microfilm's bitonal process explaining the uniform rendering. The microfilm also displays ghost text from another page near the Hitleresque man's head.) from the CIA

Philip Citroën (born 29 May 1918, date of death unknown) is most known for his claim of witnessing Adolf Hitler alive in Colombia c. 1954, when the pair were purportedly photographed together. Citroën shared his story and the photo with the United States Central Intelligence Agency (CIA), which took wider notice only after another source claimed him to be an ex-SS soldier. The CIA published microfilm of its reports in 2017, fueling fringe theories that Hitler faked his death.

According to resurfaced documents, Citroën was a Dutch soldier subdued by the Nazis after Germany invaded the Netherlands. In 2023, Argentine author Abel Basti, a fringe theorist on the topic, published a purported original print of the photo. Citing alleged family interviews and unreproduced records, Basti argues that Citroën was a submariner for the Allies, allowing him to help Hitler escape in 1945 on behalf of certain members of Dutch royalty (which he ostensibly belonged to).

== Background ==
On 29 May 1918, Philip Citroën was born in the Netherlands. The country was invaded by Nazi Germany in mid-1940 and Citroën allegedly received an identification card for the 'Dutch Construction Service', through which the Nazis controlled demobilized Dutch soldiers. Citroën was recorded as possibly providing forced labor in Germany from 1943 to 1944.

On 1 May 1945, Supreme Commander of the Navy Karl Dönitz falsely announced on German radio that Hitler had died that afternoon; in actuality, he had killed himself the day before. The occupying Soviet Union maintained secrecy about its investigation, but various sources claimed that the body thought most likely to be Hitler's was actually that of a body double. Dental remains, including part of a mandible (often inaccurately stated to be a complete jawbone), were conclusively identified as belonging to Hitler. Despite this, Soviet leader Joseph Stalin maintained that he had escaped to Spain or Argentina, where many Nazis fled.

== Claims attributed to Citroën ==
An alleged original print of the purported photograph (published in 2023) (Note: Although author Abel Basti provided no incontrovertible evidence of the print's existence and artificial intelligence visual art had progressed significantly by 2023, there are no apparent conflicts with the microfilm nor digital artifacts.)

After the war, Citroën reputedly moved to Venezuela and often traveled to Tunja, Colombia, on behalf of a Dutch shipping company. From about 1953–1954, he allegedly sometimes saw Hitler, supported by relocated Nazis. (Note: Nazi-aligned Germans reportedly addressed the man as the Führer and gave him the Nazi salute.) In early 1954, Citroën shared his story and the purported photograph to a local station of the United States Central Intelligence Agency (CIA). He also provided the negatives, which were too damaged to make more prints. The station noted the claims in a memo, but did not initially report them within the agency.

In October 1955, another CIA station received a similar report (prompting the circulation of the prior claim). In the new filing, a witness asserted that Citroën was an ex-SS soldier and borrowed the photograph, reputedly without Citroën's consent, while a photostat was made. Citroën was said to have claimed that Hitler departed around January 1955 for Argentina. (Note: Hitler has been alleged to have escaped with his wife, Eva, aboard U-530 to Argentina in mid-1945. The country's president Juan Perón (1946–1955) aided the Nazis and bolstered the ratlines. The Hitlers also supposedly later lived in the country's Inalco House.) (Note: Citroën further supposedly claimed (incorrectly) that Hitler had evaded prosecution for his war crimes due to a decade having passed since the end of WWII.) The station ascertained that it would not be able to verify the story. In November 1955, the chief of the CIA's Western Hemisphere Division recommended that the matter be dropped due to its potentially expensive nature "with remote possibilities of establishing anything concrete", but suggested that it could be forwarded to a codenamed contact.

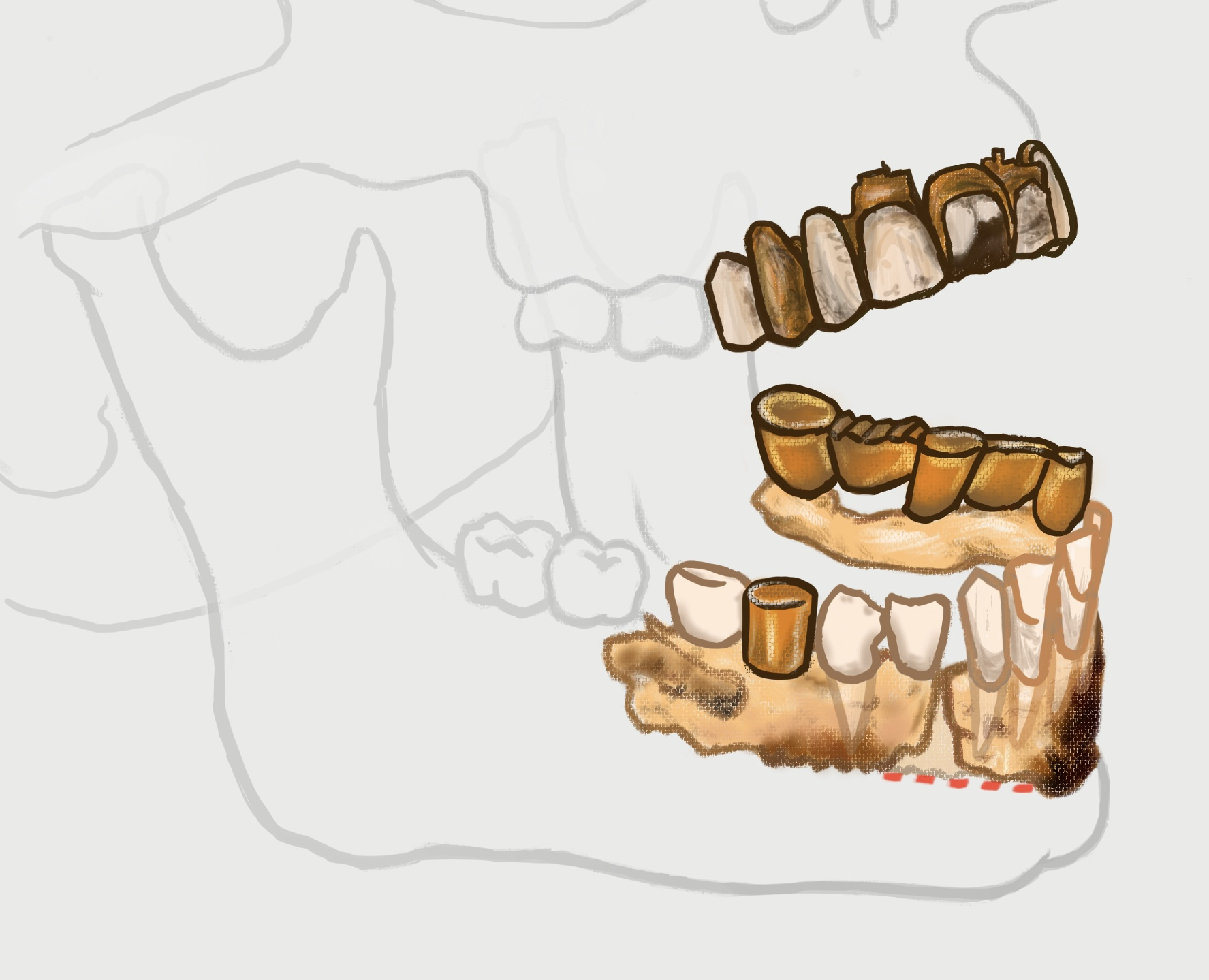
Western scholars cite Hitler's dental remains as the only bodily proof of his death in Berlin, omitting the possibility of mandibulectomy.

After a yearslong inquiry, in 1956 West Germany officially declared Hitler dead as an assumption of death, partially in order to relinquish his property. The CIA records related to Citroën were converted to microfilm in mid-1963. (Note: By 1969, the agency was microfilming records with the goal of destroying the original hard copies (and documenting that this had been done).) In 1968, a Soviet author published a supposed autopsy of Hitler's body, which has largely been debunked as propaganda except for its description of the dental remains.

In accordance with the Nazi War Crimes Disclosure Act, the CIA declassified microfilm of its reports and the photograph around the turn of the 21st century. The 2011 fringe book Grey Wolf: The Escape of Adolf Hitler described the reports and a "poor quality photostat" as unusual but "ultimately unconvincing". The online publication of the files in 2017 amongst documents related to the assassination of John F. Kennedy bolstered fringe theories about Hitler's death. (Note: History suggested online that the photo might depict a Hitler imitator seeking publicity—albeit while promoting its series claiming the dictator escaped and suggesting that the CIA missed a chance to catch him.) Western scholars reject claims of Hitler's survival, citing his confirmed dental remains and eyewitness statements as proving his death in 1945, notwithstanding the possibility of marginal mandibulectomy and supporting deception. In 2021, Worldcrunch alluded to an alleged photo in asserting that Hitler was seen wandering the streets of Tunja in 1954 "cloaked up like a peasant".

== Abel Basti's claims ==
In 2023, Argentine author Abel Basti, who has written extensively on Hitler's supposed escape to South America, published a book about his research of the purported photo. It includes a Colombian foreigner document about Citroën and an alleged copy of the original photograph—said to be provided by his son, who reputedly inherited and safeguarded it (in one case even surviving a burglary). Basti cites a supposed facial-recognition expert as determining that Hitler is shown in the image. Basti further asserts that Citroën was multilingual and had royal ties as well as some Jewish ancestry. He reputedly fought the Axis powers as a submariner with the Royal Netherlands Navy.

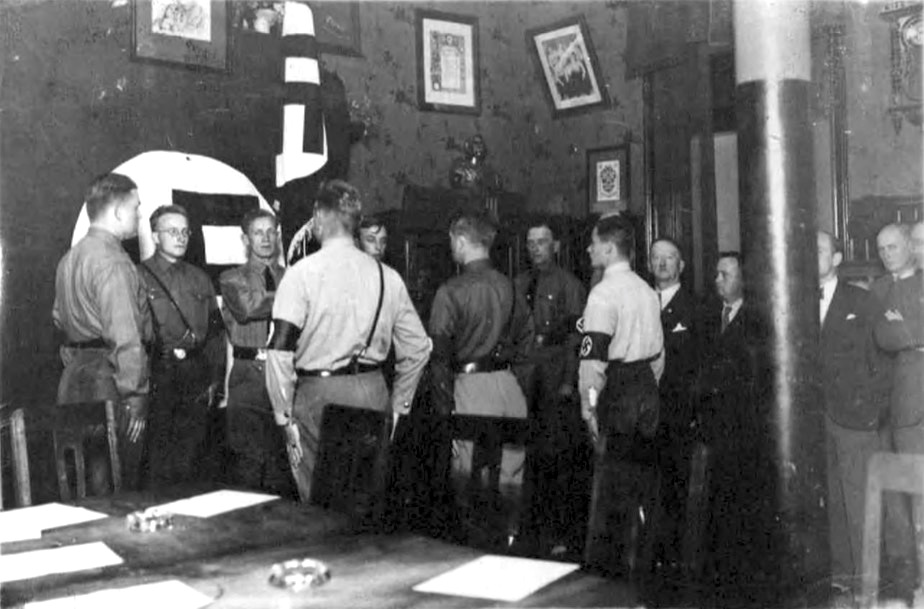
A photo from the Chilean-FBI probe of Nazis in South America (c. 1945; published in 2017) shows figures that could resemble (background, L to R): Citroën, U-530's captain, and Hitler. (Note: Given the counterespionage nature of the probe, a camera disguised as another object like a cigarette pack might have been utilized clandestinely.)

According to Basti, Allied leadership supposedly issued Citroën a document of safe conduct on 18 June 1945 in Berlin, granting him immunity in Soviet areas of occupied Germany. (Basti surmises that this was due to Allied Intelligence employing Citroën on an unknown task, perhaps in May 1945.) Citroën reportedly returned to the Netherlands before immigrating to Venezuela. Basti allegedly confirmed his presence in Tunja and found the residence from the photo. Another alleged photo of Citroën with his family shows the double doors in the background of the claimed print as well as a similar chair. A further photo allegedly shows Hitler in Buenos Aires with a receding hairline and longer hair in back, resembling his microfilm depiction.

Basti posits that Citroën offered Hitler support from alleged Nazi supporters like Prince Bernhard of the Netherlands, whom Basti ties to Citroën's brother, François (claiming some photos to show the two together). Basti contends with no further evidence that François hatched Hitler's 1945 escape from Berlin. The author suggests that, in order to maintain Dutch support, the infamous photograph was taken to prove that Hitler was still alive.

== Legacy ==
The CIA copy of the purported photo resurfaced online in early 2025, amid the 80th anniversary of the Fall of Berlin. Fact-checking outlets argued that the photograph did not confirm Hitler's survival, largely without reference to Basti's claims. Snopes cited the CIA's skepticism as a dismissal of the case. LADbible noted that the CIA had filed a report on an autopsy of Hitler's body, which has been dismissed as Soviet propaganda except for its description of the dental remains.

In September 2025, podcaster Joe Rogan opined that Hitler escaped, citing the ratlines and the controversial 2015–2018 History series Hunting Hitler. (Note: In 2018, Rogan interviewed Hunting Hitler co-host Tim Kennedy, who said he believed Hitler escaped.) Rogan derided the low quality of the microfilm, which his producer Jamie Vernon asked ChatGPT to enhance; the artificial likenesses differed from other photos of both men. Rogan expressed incredulity that anyone would be motivated to mimic Hitler down to the moustache. (Note: An earlier photograph of a Nazi chieftain in South America, from the c. 1945–1947 Chilean-led probe, depicts a greatly reduced toothbrush moustache, while Basti cites a source as indicating that Hitler employed a prop moustache while in hiding.)
