= Bernardo Timmermann =

Chilean politician

Bernardo Timmermann Buschung
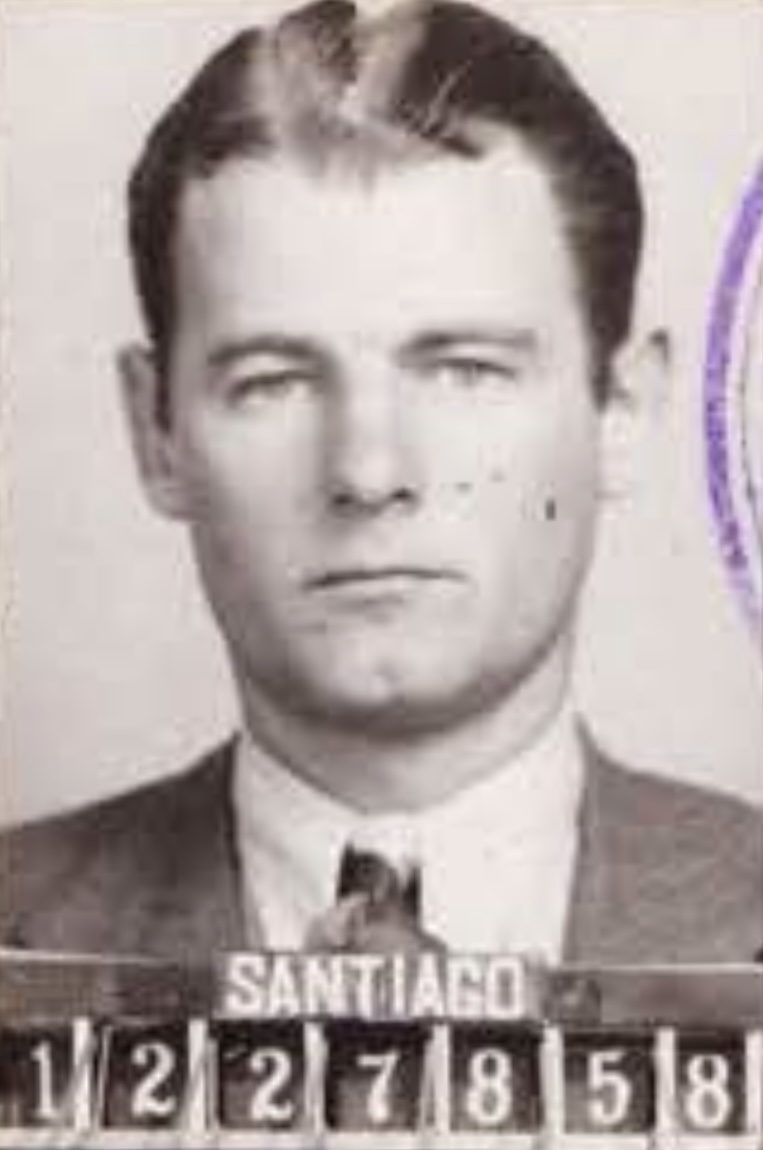
- 1944 mugshot

Mayor of Cabrero
- In office 1976–1981
- President: Augusto Pinochet Ugarte
- Preceded by: Manfred Suiter Hertlein
- Succeeded by: Luis Rivas Palma

Personal details
- Born: 18 August 1912 Concepción, Chile
- Died: 1 November 1986 (aged 74) Santiago de Chile
- Party: NSDAP (1945); Independent, nearby to National Party (1966–1986)
- Spouse: Gertrudis Bethke Bade
- Children: Five

Bernardo Francisco Timmermann Buschung (18 August 1912 – 1 November 1986), was a Chilean politician, mountaineer, and photographer of German origin, who was prosecuted for espionage during World War II for sending information to Nazi Germany. He was part of a spy ring with other German Chileans. The group was dismantled by the Chilean police, with the help of the FBI. Decades after serving his prison sentence, he served as mayor of Cabrero, being appointed by the Government of Chile during the dictatorship of Augusto Pinochet.

== Early life ==
Bernardo Francisco Timmermann Buschung was born in Concepción, on August 18, 1912. He was the son of Richard Timmermann and Adelhaide Bouschong, two German immigrants who arrived in Chile at the time of the German colonization of Valdivia, Osorno and Llanquihue.

== Life at war ==
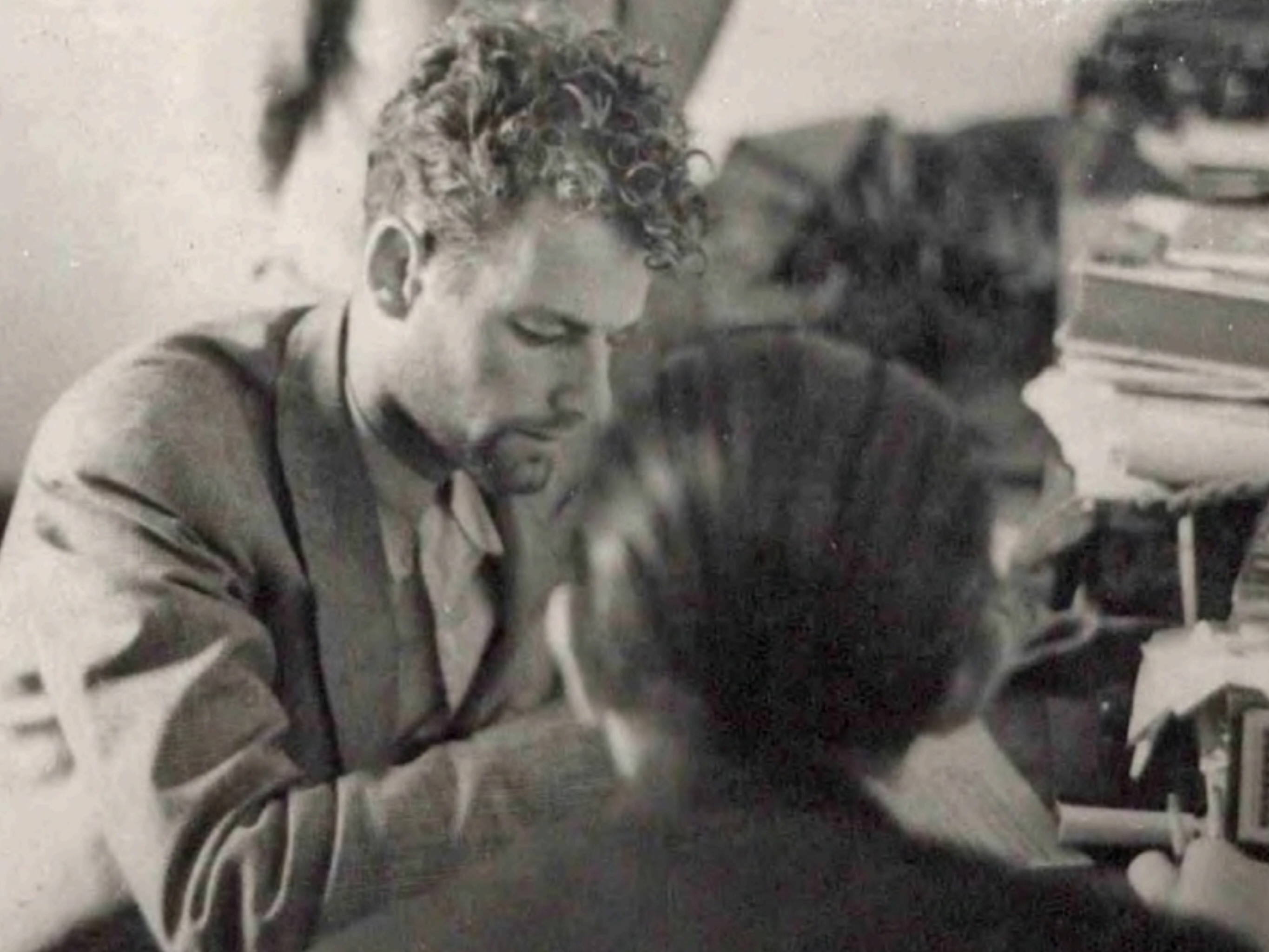
Timmermann (left) being interrogated by the Chilean police, accused of espionage

While World War II was taking place in the rest of the world, Timmermann lived in Chile, a country that did not have direct participation in the conflict until its end in 1945. At that time, according to the Investigations Police of Chile's FBI-supported Department 50, some German-Chilean circles supported the Nazi regime by carrying out a process of Nazification of the resident German community. Those involved maintained a radio network, where they maintained communication of secret information to Germany. The officials disrupted the network and arrested some of its members, including Timmermann.

== After the war ==
After the war, Timmermann moved to Yumbel, where he acquired a series of properties between 1957 and 1963, adjacent to Laja Falls, some of which suffered expropriation in 1968, during the Chilean land reform; and in addition, he suffered a series of attempts to illegally appropriate his land, when the reform became radicalized, during the Unidad Popular government of Salvador Allende. After the Allende government was overthrown in 1973, Timmermann approached the new dictatorial government of Augusto Pinochet. He was appointed mayor of Cabrero in 1976, as successor to Manfred Suiter, renowned racing driver, also German Chilean.

He died on November 1, 1986, in Santiago, Chile. He is buried in Monte Águila, Cabrero.
