= National Archives of Chile =

- Archivo Nacional de Chile
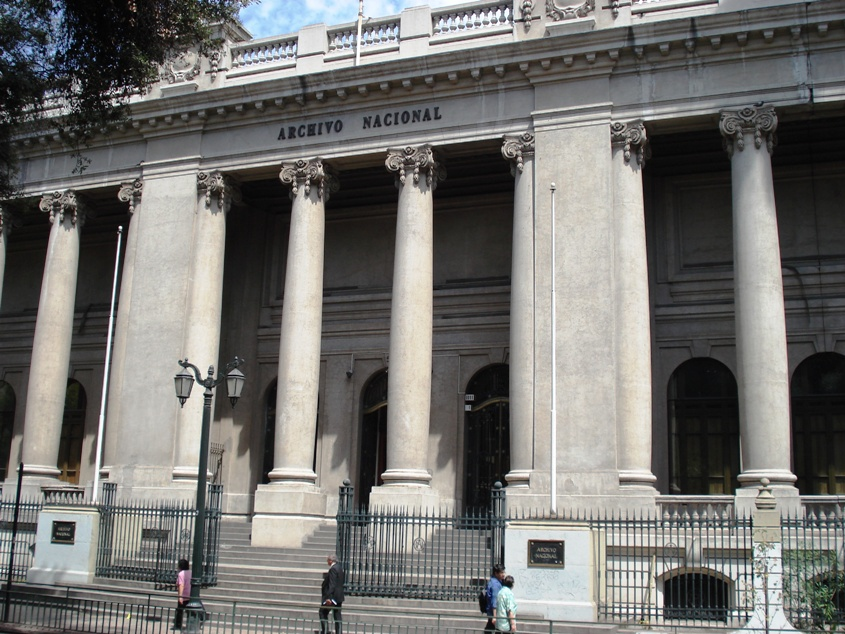
- Main building of the National Archives of Chile in Santiago.

National archives overview
- Formed: November 25, 1927; 98 years ago
- Headquarters: Miraflores 50, Santiago de Chile; 33.441944°S 70.645278°W
- National archives executive: Emma de Ramón Acevedo, Director
- Parent department: National Service for Cultural Heritage
- Website: www.archivonacional.gob.cl

The National Archives of Chile (Spanish: Archivo Nacional de Chile) is a public organization of the Chilean State, created in 1927 with the goal to "collect and conserve the archives of the Departments of State and all the documents and manuscripts related to the national history, and to oversee their organization and use". It is treated as a dependent organization of the Dirección de Bibliotecas, Archivos y Museos (Direction of Libraries, Archives, and Museums), which is administered by the Consejo Nacional de la Cultura y las Artes de Chile (National Council on Culture and the Arts).

== History ==
The organization has its historical roots in several specialized archives created by different public organizations of the Chilean State. In its foundational form, it was an office attached to the General Archive of the Instituto Nacional de Estadísticas de Chile (National Institute of Statistics of Chile), created in 1847 under the auspices of President Manuel Bulnes. The "Ley Orgánica de Ministerios" ("Organic Law of Ministries") of 1887 ordered the creation of the Archivo General de Gobierno (General Archive of the Government), a dependent to the Ministerio de Justicia e Instrucción Pública de Chile (Ministry of Justice and Public Instruction of Chile), which, together with the department of manuscripts of the Biblioteca Nacional de Chile (National Library of Chile) and the documents of the Archivo Judicial de Chile (Judicial Archive of Chile), was reorganized in to a single dependency called the Archivo Nacional de Chile.

With the creation of the Consejo Nacional de la Cultura y las Artes, the administration of the dependency was not modified, and the Archive continued under the DIBAM. In reality, the Archivo Nacional was located beside the building of the Biblioteca Nacional, at the exit of the Santiago Metro Santa Lucía station, on the street Miraflores.

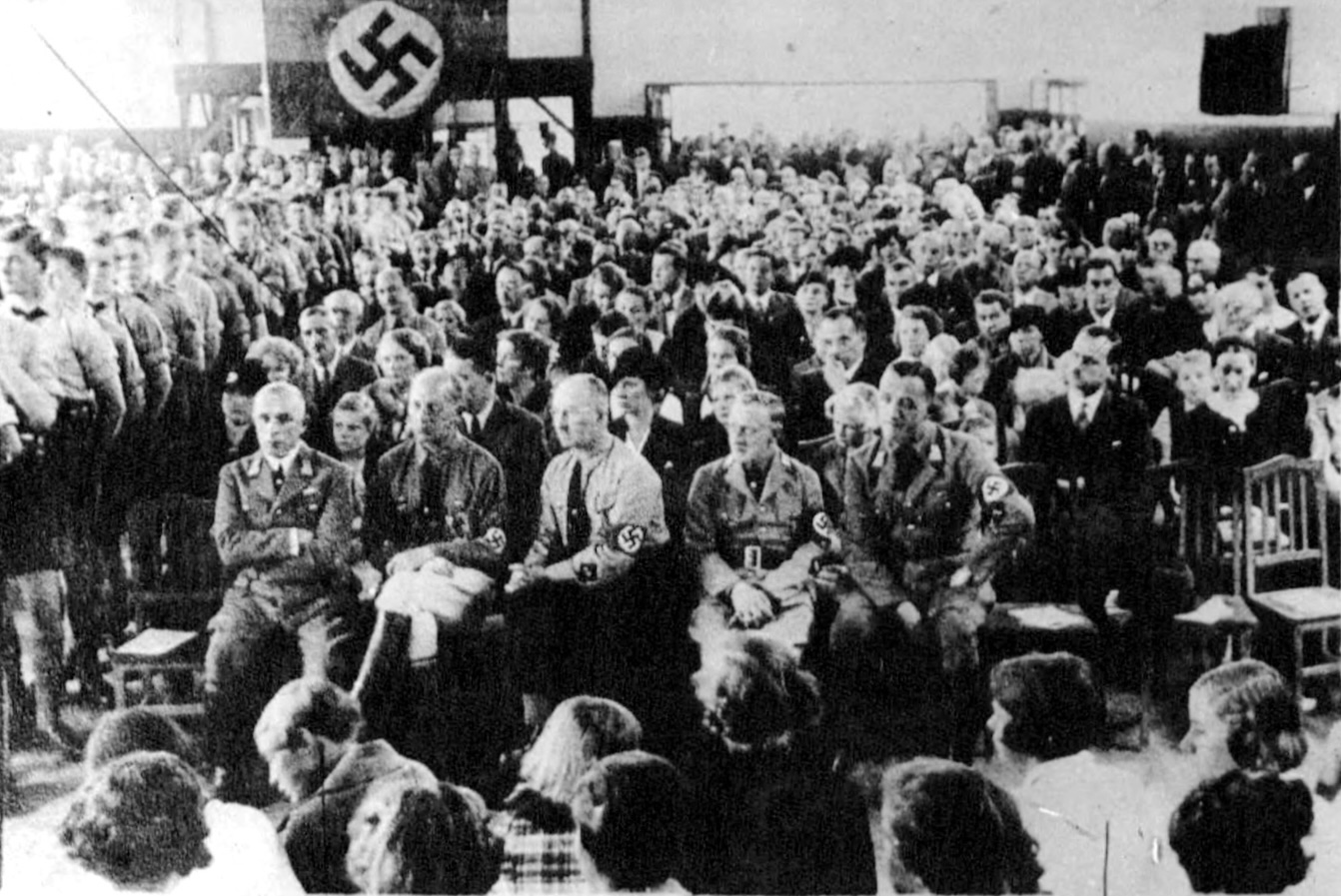
Photograph of a Nazi assembly in Latin America (c. 1945), from Chile's investigation

== Collection ==
The collection includes extensive records on an investigation of Nazi activities in the country, related to spy operations and the ratlines (routes used to escape Germany) around the end of World War II. Some photographs were shown on History's investigative documentary series Hunting Hitler.

== Location ==
The building housing the National Archives is located at 50 Miraflores Street, downtown Santiago. The building was built between 1915 and 1935 in the neoclassical style, is attached to the building housing the Biblioteca Nacional de Chile. The building occupies a blockfront between Avenida Libertador General Bernardo O'Higgins and Moneda Street, and faces the Santa Lucía Hill. The building was originally designed to house the Chilean National History Museum, which was moved to its current location in 1982. Since that year the building has served as the home for the National Archives.
