= Nazism in Chile =

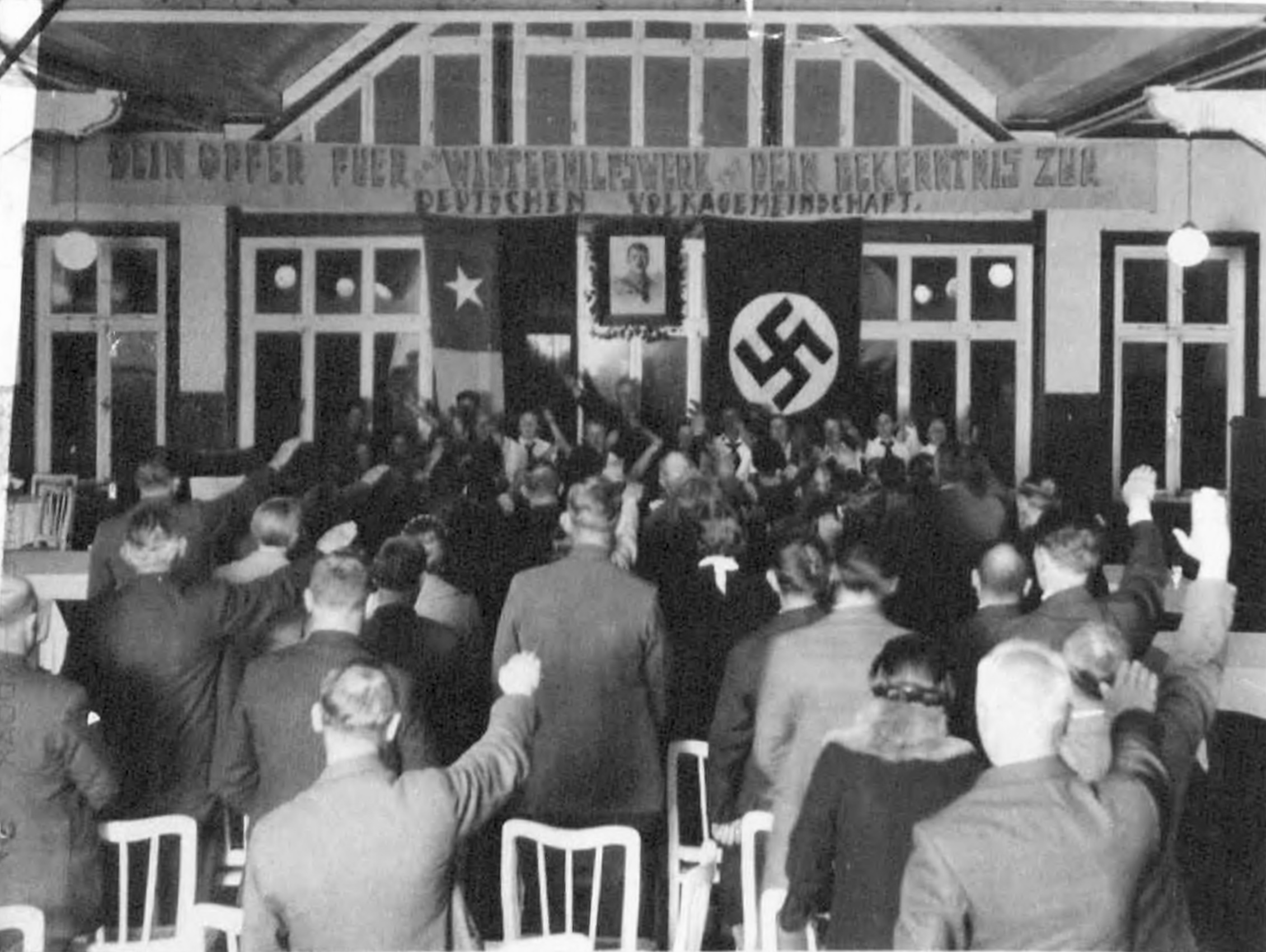
A Nazi congregation gathers in Chile, evidently to raise Winterhilfswerk funds, which Adolf Hitler reportedly controlled.

Some local support of Nazism in Chile preceded Adolf Hitler's 1933 appointment as Chancellor of Germany, including a Chilean National Socialist party active from 1932 to 1938. Nazi Germany also pursued the Nazification of German Chileans.

Nazi spy networks operated in the country between 1937 and 1944. Between 1941 and 1947, with the help of the United States Federal Bureau of Investigation, the Chilean government investigated Nazi activity, later expanded to other parts of Latin America. Numerous photographs and other documents were declassified in 2017.

Other movements related to Nazism continued to operate in Chile until the latter half of the 20th century. This included Colonia Dignidad, a site of human rights abuses during Augusto Pinochet's military dictatorship. Pinochet was supported by former Schutzstaffel (SS) officer Walter Rauff, who spent his later life in the country.

== Background ==
Chilean physician Nicolás Palacios, a proponent of the scientific racism ideology, considered the "Chilean race" to be a mix of two bellicose master races: the Visigoths of Spain and the Mapuche (Araucanians) of Chile. Palacios traces the origins of the Spanish component of the "Chilean race" to the coast of the Baltic Sea, specifically to Götaland in Sweden, one of the supposed homelands of the Goths. Palacios claimed that both the blonde-haired and the bronze-coloured Chilean Mestizos share a "moral physonomy" and a masculine psychology. He opposed immigration from Southern Europe and argued that Mestizos who are derived from Southern Europeans lack "cerebral control" and are a social load.

== History ==
=== Early influence ===
There was a German Chilean youth organization with strong Nazi influence prior to 1933 (when Adolf Hitler and the Nazi Party gained control of Germany). Germany pursued a policy of Nazification of the German Chilean community, as it did elsewhere. The German Chilean communities and their organizations were considered a cornerstone to extend the Nazi ideology across the world, and they mostly supported Nazi Germany (at least passively), with a widespread presence in the country's German Lutheran Church. The Chilean German community, however, did not act as an official extension of the German state. A local chapter of the Nazi Party was started in Chile.

The National Socialist Movement of Chile (MNSCH) was founded in 1932. After it was dissolved in 1938, some of its notable former members migrated into the Agrarian Labor Party, obtaining high charges. Other former MNSCH members formed new parties of that kind until 1952.

=== Nazi subversion and official investigation ===
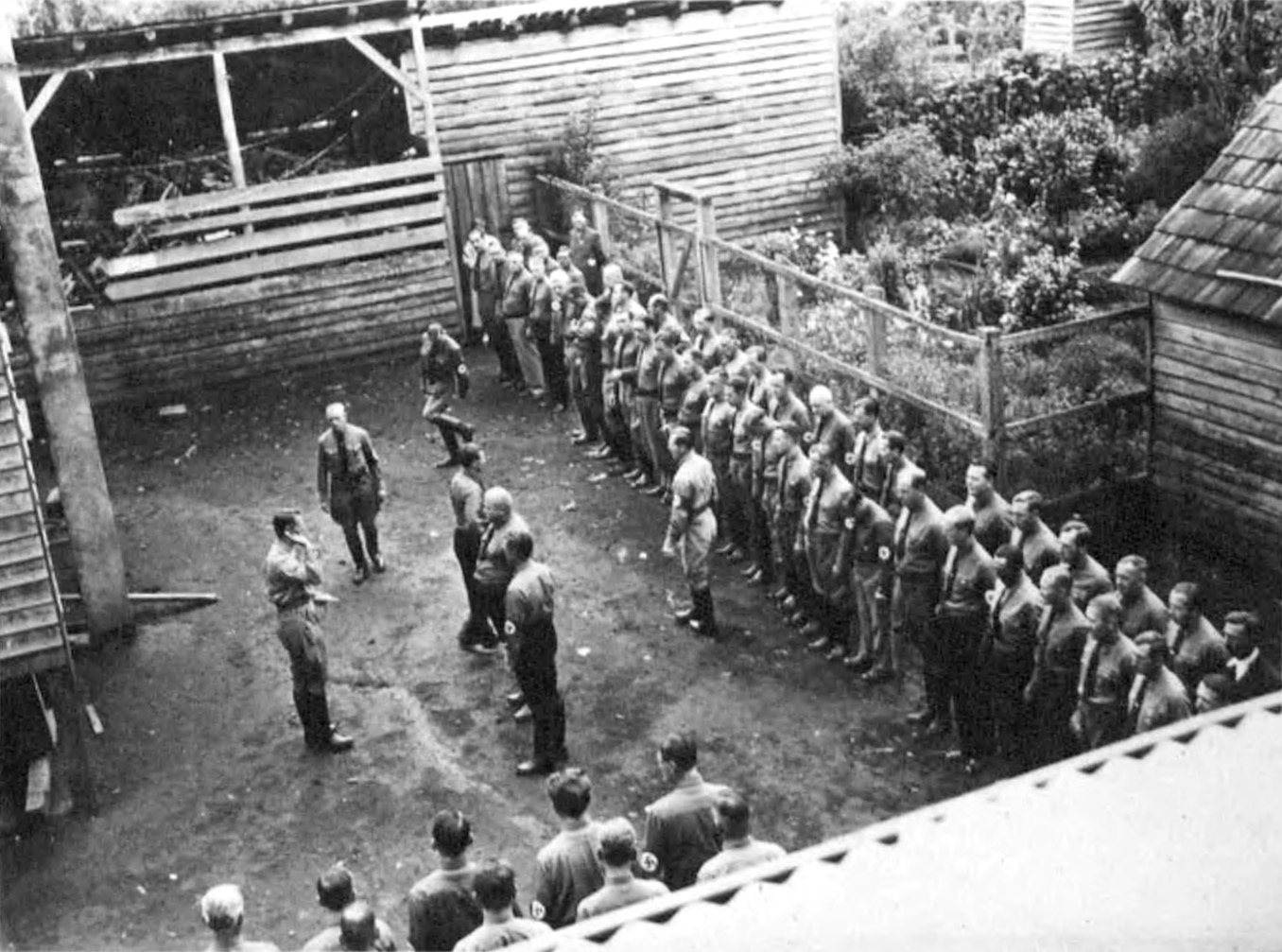
Nazis gather in Chile, from the official probe

Between 1937 and 1944, Nazi spy networks operated in Chile, which the Chilean Navy discovered via radio. In 1941, the director general of the Investigations Police of Chile established a department that probed local pro-Nazi activity through 1947. The police team had the support of the United States Federal Bureau of Investigation's wartime Special Intelligence Service. The investigators broke up one spy ring in 1942 and another in 1944. The latter reportedly received its orders from German High Command and the Axis espionage operations center, partially based out of Chile's capital, Santiago, until the counterespionage effort forced it to shift fully to Argentina's capital, Buenos Aires. The department subsequently prevented a sabotage plot (which targeted the Panama Canal) by the Chile-based head of Latin America's Nazi espionage network. Chile was then joined by other governments in probing Nazi activity throughout Latin America.

In 2017, records from the investigation were declassified and turned over to the National Archives of Chile. In 2018, History's investigative documentary series Hunting Hitler visited the archives and learned of the alleged existence of a network of over 750 outposts resembling Chile's Nazi-tied Colonia Dignidad. Additionally, a concentration camp was claimed to have been run by former Schutzstaffel (SS) officer Walter Rauff (Note: Rauff was known for modifying gas vans for mobile killings during the Holocaust.) who supported Chilean dictator Augusto Pinochet.

Senior SS officer Richard Glücks, believed to have died in 1945, has also been speculated to have escaped Germany, allegedly to Chile.

=== Colonia Dignidad ===
Colonia Dignidad (Spanish pronunciation: [koˈlonja ðiɣniˈðað]; lit. 'Dignity Colony') was an isolated colony established in post-World War II Chile by emigrant Germans which became notorious for the internment, torture, and murder of dissidents during the military dictatorship of General Augusto Pinochet in the 1970s while under the leadership of German emigrant preacher Paul Schäfer. Colonia Dignidad has been described as a "state within a state".

=== Other movements ===
A new Nazi Party was formed in 1964 by school teacher Franz Pfeiffer; it organised a "Miss Nazi" beauty contest and formed a Chilean branch of the Ku Klux Klan before disbanding in 1970. Pfeiffer attempted to reboot the party in 1983 amid a wave of protests against Pinochet's military dictatorship.

== Resistance ==
Nazism had also detractors in Chile. An example of this is the telegram sent by Salvador Allende and other members of the Congress of Chile to Hitler after the Kristallnacht (1938) in which they denounced the persecution of Jews.

== See also ==
- Francoist influence in Chile
- Imperial German influence on Chile
- Miguel Serrano
- Pinochetism
- Seguro Obrero massacre
