= Conspiracy theories about Adolf Hitler's death =

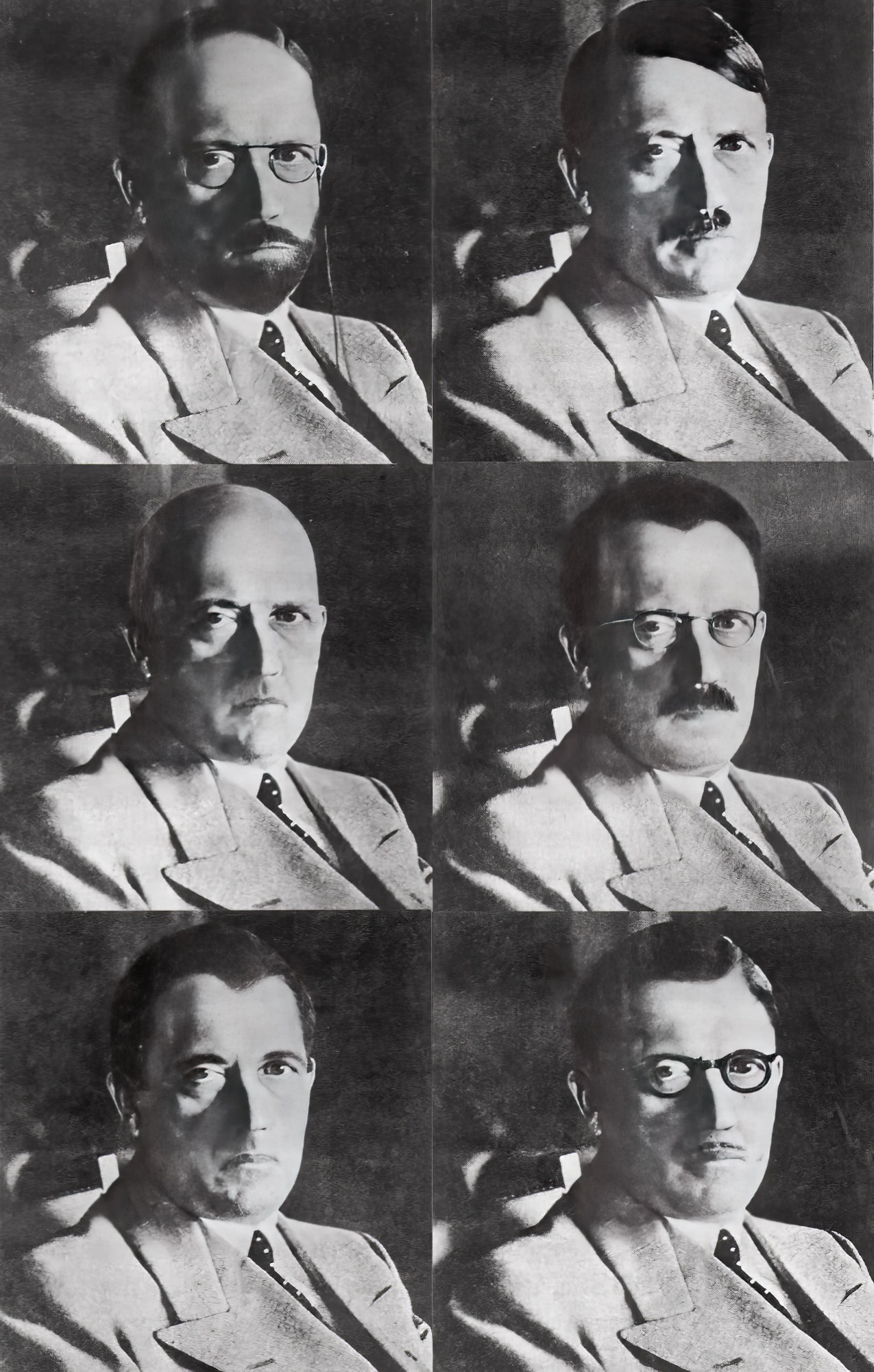
In 1944 (prior to D-Day), the United States Secret Service imagined several ways Hitler could disguise his appearance to evade capture.

Fringe and conspiracy theories about the death of Adolf Hitler, dictator of Germany from 1933 to 1945, contradict the accepted fact that he died by suicide in the Führerbunker on 30 April 1945. Largely stemming from a campaign of Soviet disinformation, most of these theories hold that Hitler and his wife, Eva Braun, survived and escaped from Berlin, typically asserting that he fled to South America.

In the post-war years, the United States Federal Bureau of Investigation (FBI) and Central Intelligence Agency (CIA) investigated related reports and an alleged photograph but did not endorse their veracity. The 21st-century declassification of these files has helped fuel fringe theories, in addition to the revelation that a skull in the Soviet archives purported to be Hitler's actually belonged to a woman.

The claims have received some exposure in popular culture, but are regarded by historians and scientific experts as being disproven by the hard evidence of Hitler's dental remains (including teeth on a mandibular fragment, the only part of his body confirmed) and certain eyewitness accounts.

== Origins ==
Prior to Hitler's suicide in Berlin, some dubious sources claimed that the dictator's death would be (or had already been) obscured through the use of a double. In 1944, ahead of D-Day, the United States Secret Service imagined several ways Hitler could potentially disguise his appearance to evade capture.

The narrative that Hitler did not commit suicide, but instead escaped Berlin, was first presented to the general public by Marshal Georgy Zhukov at a press conference on 9 June 1945, on orders from Soviet leader Joseph Stalin. That month, 68% of Americans polled thought Hitler was still alive. When asked at the Potsdam Conference in July 1945 how Hitler had died, Stalin said he was either living "in Spain or Argentina", where the Nazis had escape routes. In July 1945, British newspapers repeated comments from a Soviet officer that a charred body discovered by the Soviets was "a very poor double". American newspapers also repeated dubious quotes, such as that of the Russian garrison commandant of Berlin, who claimed that Hitler had "gone into hiding somewhere in Europe". In October 1945, France-Soir quoted Otto Abetz, Nazi ambassador to Vichy France during World War II, as saying that Hitler was not dead.

The Soviet disinformation has been a springboard for various conspiracy theories, despite the official conclusion by Western powers and the consensus of historians that Hitler killed himself on 30 April 1945.

== Forensic evidence ==
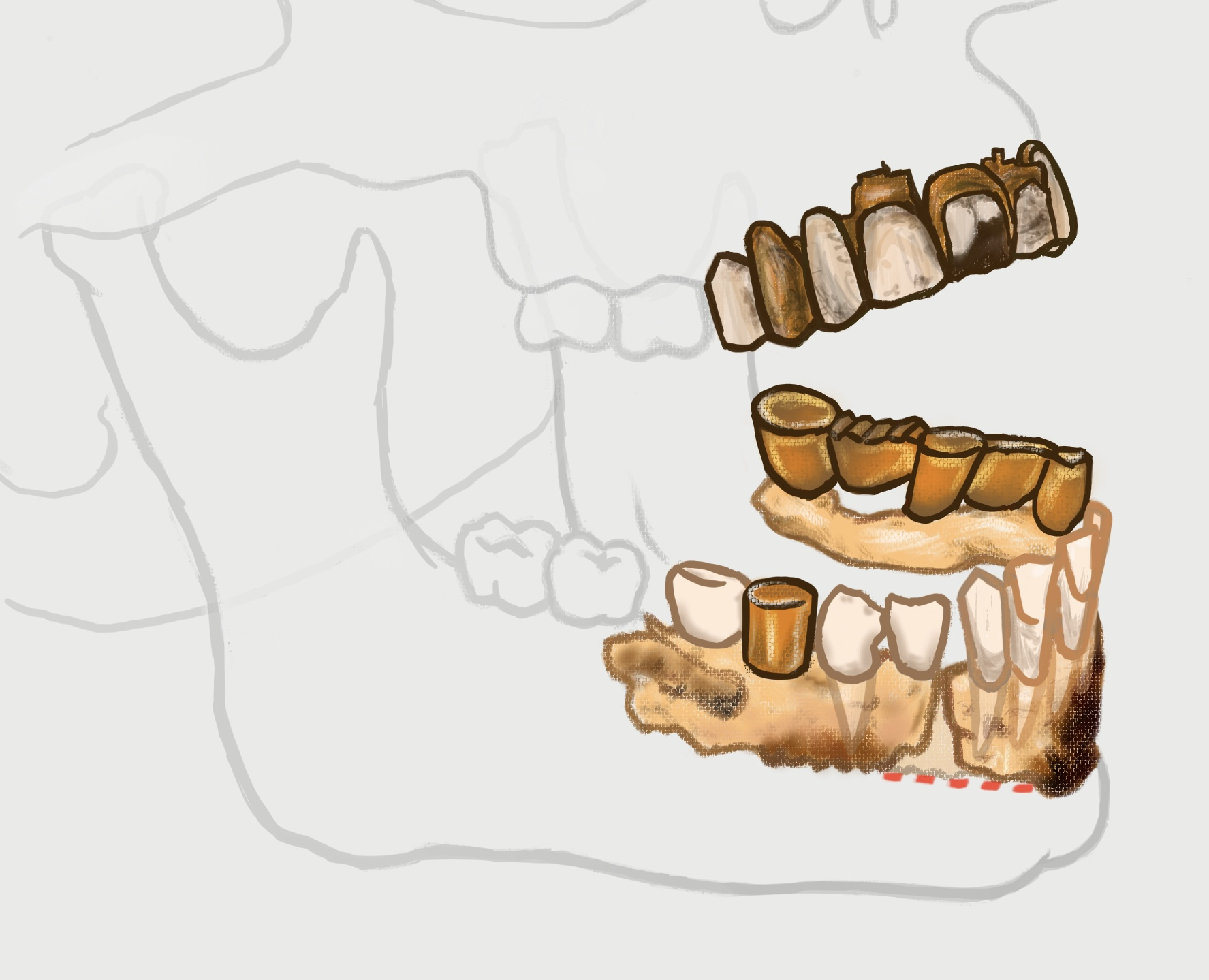
Hitler's dental remains are all that were confirmed to belong to his body.

In May 1945, the Soviets found a jawbone fragment (sundered at the alveolar process) and two dental bridges in the Reich Chancellery garden. These were shown to two associates of Hitler's personal dentist, Hugo Blaschke: his assistant Käthe Heusermann and longtime dental technician Fritz Echtmann. They identified the dental remains as Hitler's and Braun's, as did Blaschke in later statements. In 1972, forensic odontologist Reidar F. Sognnaes helped confirm Hitler's dental remains, but later argued that the alleged Soviet autopsy of Braun's corpse did not match her dental records, citing Heusermann as stating that a bridge was designed for Braun but never fitted. Author Hugh Thomas theorized that only Hitler's dental remains belonged to him, which reporter Ada Petrova and Peter Watson dismissed, citing the debunked Soviet autopsy report. (Note: Petrova and Watson cite the forensic report as saying the fragmentary dental remains were clamping down on the tongue, calling this "a very difficult arrangement to fake". Thomas also speculated that Hitler was strangled to death by his valet Heinz Linge, which Petrova and Watson note that "even Dr Thomas admits that there is no evidence to support". Historian Ian Kershaw wrote that "The 'theories' of Hugh Thomas ... that Hitler was strangled by Linge, and that the female body burned was not that of Eva Braun, who escaped from the bunker, belong in fairyland.") In 2017, a team led by French forensic pathologist Philippe Charlier reconfirmed Hitler's dental remains, finding that teeth on one of the jawbone fragments were in "perfect agreement" with an X-ray taken of Hitler in 1944. The findings of this investigation were reported in May 2018. Charlier stated that "There is no possible doubt. Our study proves that Hitler died in 1945".

At the end of 1945, Stalin ordered a second commission to investigate Hitler's death, in part to investigate rumours of Hitler's survival. On 30 May 1946, part of a skull was found, ostensibly in the crater where Hitler's remains had been exhumed. It consists of part of the occipital bone and part of both parietal bones. The nearly complete left parietal bone has a bullet hole, apparently an exit wound. (Note: The skull fragment remained uncatalogued until 1975, and was rediscovered in the Russian State Archives in 1993.) In 2009, on an episode of History's MysteryQuest, University of Connecticut archaeologist and bone specialist Nick Bellantoni examined the skull fragment, which Soviet officials had believed to be Hitler's. According to Bellantoni, "The bone seemed very thin" for a male, (Note: French forensic pathologist Philippe Charlier later stated, "When doing [an examination] of the skull, you have a 55 per cent chance of getting the sex right.") (Note: According to a scientific article co-authored by Philippe Charlier, the sex is difficult to determine due to two factors: severe heating from burning, which could have reduced the skull's thickness, and the absence of the nuchal crest.) and "the sutures where the skull plates come together seemed to correspond to someone under 40". A small piece detached from the skull was DNA-tested, as was blood from Hitler's sofa. The skull was determined to be that of a woman—providing fodder for conspiracy theorists—while the blood was confirmed to belong to a male. (Note: This prompted the vice president of the Russian state archive to say, "No one claimed that was Hitler's skull.")

== Later claims ==
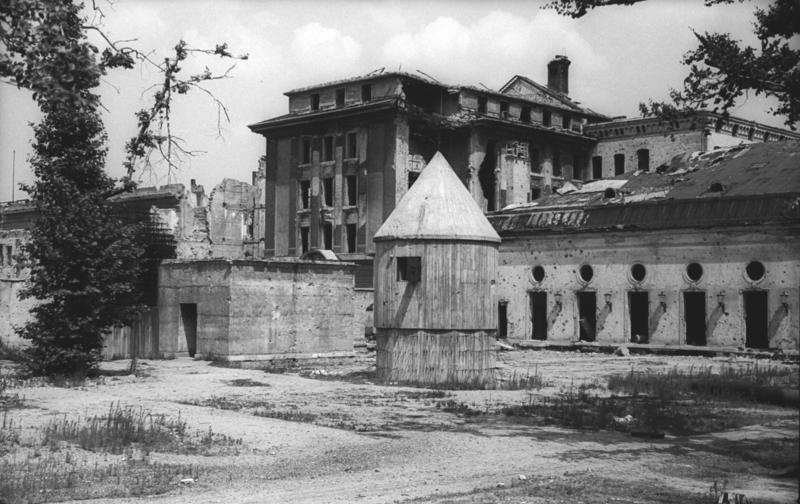
The Führerbunker complex, where Hitler spent his last days in Berlin, before demolition in 1947

The first detailed investigation by Western powers began in November 1945 after Dick White, then head of counter-intelligence in the British sector of Berlin, had their agent Hugh Trevor-Roper investigate the matter to counter the Soviet claims. Trevor-Roper concluded that Hitler and Braun died by suicide in Berlin, expanding his report into a book in 1947. In April 1947, 45% of Americans polled thought Hitler was still alive.

In 1946, an American miner and Baptist preacher named William Henry Johnson began sending out a series of letters under the pen name "Furrier No. 1", claiming to be the living Hitler and to have escaped with Braun to Kentucky. He alleged that tunnels were being dug to Washington, D.C., and that he would engage armies, nuclear bombs and invisible spaceships to take over the universe. Johnson was able to raise up to $15,000 (about $248,000 currently), promising lofty incentives to his supporters, before being arrested on charges of mail fraud in mid-1956.

In the introduction to the 1947 American book Who Killed Hitler?, US intelligence officer William F. Heimlich asserts that a one-day investigation of the Führerbunker grounds produced no evidence of Hitler's death. The book itself asserts that Reichsführer-SS Heinrich Himmler introduced a double to the bunker in hopes of keeping Hitler alive. Himmler then purportedly conspired with Hitler's physician to kill the dictator via poison, with Hitler's adjutant Otto Günsche apparently delivering a coup de grace-style gunshot to a corpse at the time of the recorded suicide. The book suggests that, barring further revelations, Hitler's death remained "a mystery without an ending", but argues that the myth of his survival was Soviet propaganda to motivate "Communist totalitarian" forces against "the continuing menace of Fascism". (Note: The book considers the survival of Hitler's secretary Martin Bormann probable, citing a 12 July 1945 Soviet report that they had captured him.) According to historian Luke Daly-Groves, declassified American intelligence files show that certain information from the investigations of Hitler's death was kept from Heimlich "because higher-ranking American intelligence officers were aware that he was attempting to capitalise on sensational rumours". Daly-Groves contends that Heimlich's statements in the 1947 book proved these suspicions to be correct, and that his arguments show that he was not fully informed of the evidence. Historian Richard J. Evans states that Heimlich resented "being side-lined in favour of Trevor-Roper's investigation [and was] ill informed" and that the story about Hitler being murdered on Himmler's orders "has never been taken seriously by historians".

In March 1948, newspapers around the world reported the account of former German lieutenant Arthur F. Mackensen, who claimed that on 5 May 1945 (during the Soviet bombardment of Berlin), he, Hitler, Braun and Martin Bormann had escaped the Führerbunker in tanks. The group allegedly flew from Tempelhof Airport to Tønder, Denmark, where Hitler gave a speech and took a flight with Braun to the coast. In a May 1948 issue of the Italian magazine Tempo, author Emil Ludwig wrote that a double could have been cremated in Hitler's place, allowing him to flee by submarine to Argentina. Presiding judge at the Einsatzgruppen trial at Nuremberg Michael Musmanno wrote in his 1950 book that such theories were "about as rational as to say that Hitler was carried away by angels," citing a lack of evidence, the confirmation of Hitler's dental remains, and the fact that Ludwig had expressly ignored the presence of witnesses in the bunker. In his refutation of Mackensen's account, Musmanno cites a subsequent story of Mackensen's, in which the lieutenant allegedly flew on 9 May to Málaga, Spain, when he was attacked by 30 Lightning fighters over Marseille (despite the war having ended in Europe), purportedly killing all 33 passengers except himself.

From 1951 to 1972, the National Police Gazette, an American tabloid-style magazine, ran a series of stories asserting Hitler's survival. Unproven allegations include that Hitler conceived children with Braun around the late 1930s, (Note: Reports of Hitler and Braun conceiving children were stated to be false in 1945 by Hitler's chauffeur, Erich Kempka, and pilot Hanna Reitsch—both of whom also provided details regarding Hitler's death.) that he was actually in prime physical health at the end of World War II, and that he fled to Antarctica or South America. Writing for the Gazette, Heimlich claimed that the blood found on Hitler's sofa did not match his blood type. As Richard Evans points out, tabloid magazines such as the Gazette have made a "career" out of sensational stories of Hitler's survival since the war ended.

=== Reports to U.S. intelligence agencies ===
FBI documents declassified by the 1998 Nazi War Crimes Disclosure Act, which began to be released online by the early 2010s, contain a number of alleged sightings of Hitler in Europe, South America, and the U.S., some of which assert that he changed his appearance e.g. via plastic surgery. Richard J. Evans notes that the FBI was obliged to document such claims no matter how "erroneous or deranged" they were, while American historian Donald McKale states that their files did not produce any credible indication of Hitler's survival.

=== CIA intelligence files and the Colombian conspiracy ===
Declassified files released in 2017 revealed that the United States Central Intelligence Agency (CIA) tracked reports during the mid-1950s concerning Adolf Hitler's alleged presence in Colombia. The core of the investigation stemmed from an 3 October 1955, classified memorandum sent to Washington by David Brixnor, the CIA chief of base in Caracas.This document summarized accounts from an informant codenamed "CIMELODY-3," who detailed claims made by Phillip Citroen, a former SS trooper working for the Royal Dutch Steamship Company.

Citroen maintained that he had been in monthly contact throughout 1954 with an individual who was a look-alike of Hitler residing in Tunja, the capital of Boyacá. The informant stated that the man operated under the pseudonym "Adolf Schrittelmayor" and lived within a local circle of German nationals and former officers who still honored him with Nazi salutes and the title of Der Führer.

=== Alleged Soviet autopsy ===
In 1968, Soviet journalist Lev Bezymenski released his book The Death of Adolf Hitler. It includes a purported Soviet autopsy report which concludes that Hitler died by cyanide poisoning, despite no dissection of internal organs being recorded to confirm this and eyewitness accounts to the contrary. Bezymenski claims that the autopsy reports were not released earlier to discourage anyone from trying to assume the identity of "the Führer saved by a miracle". He further asserts that any gunshot would have been fired as a coup de grâce, most likely by Günsche. He later admitted that he was acting as "a typical party propagandist" and intended "to lead the reader to the conclusion that [a gunshot] was a pipe dream or half an invention and that Hitler actually poisoned himself". The book's claims have been widely derided by Western historians.

=== Grey Wolf ===
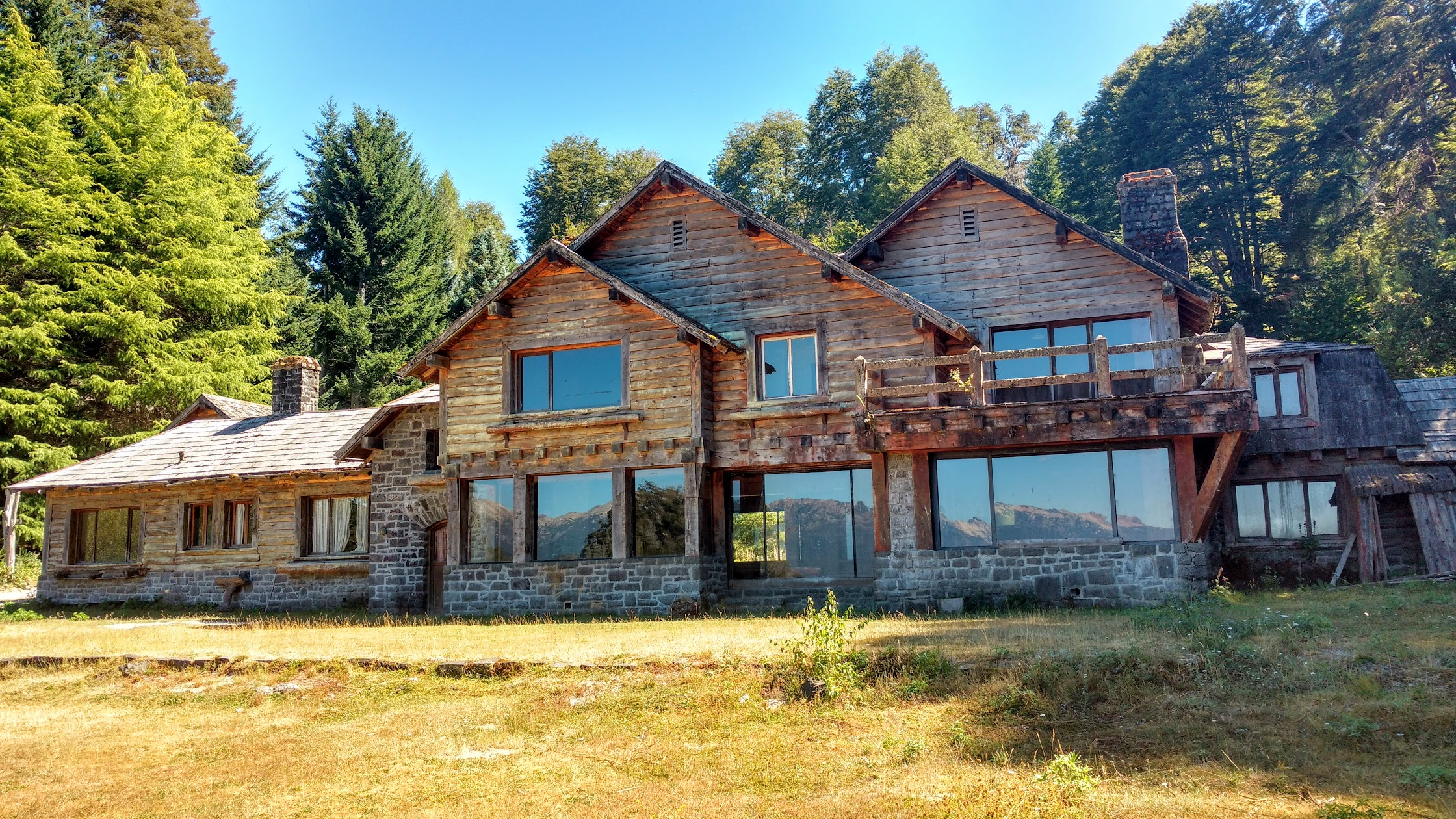
The Inalco House near the current settlement of Villa La Angostura. According to the fringe theory, Hitler would have lived some years here after 1945.

The 2011 book Grey Wolf: The Escape of Adolf Hitler by British authors Simon Dunstan and Gerrard Williams, and the 2014 docudrama film by Williams based on it, suggest that a number of U-boats took certain Nazis and Nazi loot to Argentina, where the Nazis were supported by future president Juan Perón, who, with his wife Evita, had been receiving money from the Nazis for some time. As reported claims received by the FBI stated, Hitler allegedly arrived in Argentina, first staying at Hacienda San Ramón (east of San Carlos de Bariloche), then moved to a Bavarian-style mansion at Inalco, a remote and barely accessible spot at the northwest end of Nahuel Huapi Lake, close to the Chilean border. Eva Braun supposedly left Hitler around 1954 and moved to Neuquén with their daughter, Ursula ('Uschi'), while Hitler allegedly died in February 1962. The book passingly asserts that Bormann gave the U.S. Office of Strategic Services stolen art and military secrets in exchange for Hitler's life.

This theory of Hitler's flight to Argentina has been dismissed by historians, including Guy Walters. He has described Dunstan and Williams' theory as "rubbish", adding: "There's no substance to it at all. It appeals to the deluded fantasies of conspiracy theorists and has no place whatsoever in historical research." Historian Richard Evans has many misgivings about the book and subsequent film. For example, he notes that the story about Ursula or 'Uschi' is merely "second-hand hearsay evidence without identification or corroboration". Evans also notes that Dunstan and Williams made extensive use of the unreliable book Hitler murió en la Argentina (1987) by Manuel Monasterio, who later admitted including made-up "strange ramblings" and speculation. McKale notes that Grey Wolf repeats many claims made over the preceding decades which are implied by remote association, stating that "[w]hen one has no factual or otherwise reliable proof, one resorts to associating [...] with something else or to using hearsay and other dubious evidence, including unnamed or unidentified sources."

=== Hunting Hitler ===
On the History Channel series Hunting Hitler (2015–2018), investigators (including Gerrard Williams) cite declassified documents and interview witnesses which allegedly indicate that Hitler escaped from Germany and travelled to South America by U-boat. He and other Nazis then allegedly plotted a "Fourth Reich". Such conspiracy theories of survival and escape have been widely dismissed. Contradictorily, in 2017 the series was praised by the tabloid-style National Police Gazette, which historically was a supporter of the fringe theory, while calling on Russia to allow Hitler's jawbone remains to be DNA-tested. (Note: Historian Antony Beevor and Philippe Charlier have stated their support for such a DNA test, while affirming that the dental remains certainly belong to Hitler.) After being featured on the series as an expert on World War II, author James Holland explained that "[I] was very careful never to mention on film that I thought either Hitler or Bormann escaped. Because they didn't."

== Legacy ==
The survival narrative caused a minor resurgence in Nazism during the Allied occupation of Germany. In spite of the disinformation from Stalin's government and eyewitness discrepancies, the consensus of Western historians is that Hitler killed himself on 30 April 1945. Some explain the limited forensic evidence as due to the burning of the body to near ashes. (Note: According to German forensic biologist Mark Benecke, body water would hinder the success of an open-air cremation.) In his 2020 book, Richard Evans dismissed all survival stories of Hitler as "fantasies", although he cited the debunked Soviet autopsies as evidence that Hitler's body was found. Evans wrote:

For some on the far right it seems inconceivable that [Hitler] would have died such a cowardly and ignominious death. ... In some cases, the proponents of Hitler's survival have strong links to the neo-Nazi scene, or betray Anti-Semitic beliefs, or are involved with white supremacy organisations in the US that regard Hitler as an inspiration for their activities. ... Some fringe groups purveying various forms of 'alternative' knowledge, such as occultists or UFO enthusiasts, seem to think that associating their beliefs with Hitler will gain them attention. So in some versions of the survival myth, Hitler's escape was achieved by occult means, or involved his travelling to a secret Nazi flying saucer base beneath the Antarctic ice.

== In popular culture ==
- In the adventure novel On the World's Roof (1949) by Douglas Valder Duff, a group of escaped Nazi officers with their Leader (purportedly Hitler himself) plan to bombard capital cities around the world with nuclear weapons from their stronghold in Tibet.
- In the 1965 Japanese comedy film The Crazy Adventure, Hitler escapes Berlin and travels via U-boat to his secret base in Japan where he remains until the Crazy Cats discover the location decades later. Hitler is played by Turkish actor Andrew Hughes.
- In a 1968 film, titled They Saved Hitler's Brain, Hitler's brain is rescued and taken to South America.
- In the 1981 novella The Portage to San Cristobal of A.H. by George Steiner, Hitler survives the end of the war and escapes to the Amazon jungle, where he is found and tried by Nazi-hunters 30 years later. Hitler's defence is that since Israel owes its existence to the Holocaust, he is really the benefactor of the Jews.
- In the novel The Berkut (1987), Hitler escapes from Berlin with the intention of reaching South America, but is secretly captured by elite Soviet commandos under Stalin's orders. He is imprisoned in Moscow and later executed.
- In a 1995 The Simpsons episode, "Bart vs. Australia", Bart Simpson makes a call to Buenos Aires, which is received by an elderly Hitler.
- In the 1999 video game Persona 2: Innocent Sin, a rumor is spread that Hitler was saved by elite soldiers and fled with those soldiers to Antarctica, resulting in this "Last Battalion" taking over Sumaru City. Unlike most depictions of Hitler's survival beyond 1945, this is not actually true within the story's context; the story concerns rumors becoming reality, and the "Hitler" the party fights turns out to be Nyarlathotep in disguise.
- In the CGI anime film Lupin III: The First (2019), Interpol spreads a fake rumor stating that Hitler is alive and living in Brazil, in order to lure his fanatical Ahnenerbe followers out of hiding.
- In the 2020 Amazon Prime TV-series Hunters, it is discovered in 1977 that Adolf Hitler and Eva Braun are living in Argentina.

== See also ==
- Alleged doubles of Adolf Hitler

== Bibliography ==
- Beschloss, Michael (December 2002). "Dividing the Spoils". Smithsonian Magazine.
- Bezymenski, Lev (1968). The Death of Adolf Hitler (1st ed.). New York: Harcourt, Brace & World.
- Brisard, Jean-Christophe; Parshina, Lana (2018). The Death of Hitler. Da Capo Press. ISBN 978-0306922589.
- Charlier, Philippe; Weil, Raphael; Rainsard, P.; Poupon, Joël; Brisard, J.C. (1 May 2018). "The remains of Adolf Hitler: A biomedical analysis and definitive identification". European Journal of Internal Medicine. 54: e10–e12. doi:10.1016/j.ejim.2018.05.014. PMID 29779904. S2CID 29159362.
- Daly-Groves, Luke (2019). Hitler's Death: The Case Against Conspiracy. Oxford, UK: Osprey. ISBN 978-1-4728-3454-6.
- de Boer, Sjoerd (2022). The Hitler Myths: Exposing the Truth Behind the Stories about the Führer. Frontline Books. ISBN 978-1-39901-905-7.
- Eberle, Henrik; Uhl, Matthias, eds. (2005). The Hitler Book: The Secret Dossier Prepared for Stalin from the Interrogations of Hitler's Personal Aides. New York: Public Affairs. ISBN 978-1-58648-366-1.
- Evans, Richard (2020). The Hitler Conspiracies. London: Oxford University Press. ISBN 978-0190083052.
- Fest, Joachim (2004). Inside Hitler's Bunker: The Last Days of the Third Reich. New York: Farrar, Straus and Giroux. ISBN 978-0-374-13577-5.
- Isachenkov, Vladimir (20 February 1993). "Russians say they have bones from Hitler's skull". Gadsden Times. Associated Press.
- Joachimsthaler, Anton (1999) [1995]. The Last Days of Hitler: The Legends, The Evidence, The Truth. London: Brockhampton Press. ISBN 978-1-86019-902-8.
- Kershaw, Ian (2001) [2000]. Hitler, 1936–1945: Nemesis. New York: W. W. Norton & Company. ISBN 0-393-04994-9.
- Kershaw, Ian (2008). Hitler: A Biography. New York: W. W. Norton & Company. ISBN 978-0-393-06757-6.
- Musmanno, Michael A. (1950). Ten Days to Die. Garden City, NY: Doubleday.
- Petrova, Ada; Watson, Peter (1995). The Death of Hitler: The Full Story with New Evidence from Secret Russian Archives. W.W. Norton & Company. ISBN 978-0-393-03914-6.
