= Nazi War Crimes and Japanese Imperial Government Records Interagency Working Group =

American government interagency group

The Nazi War Crimes and Japanese Imperial Government Records Interagency Working Group is a United States government interagency group, which is tasked with locating, identifying, inventorying, and recommending for declassification classified U.S. records relating to Nazi German and Imperial Japanese war crimes.

The group was created by the Nazi War Crimes Disclosure Act (NWCDA), passed in 1998, and the Japanese Imperial Government Disclosure Act of 2000 (JIGDA). The Interagency Working Group (IWG) has declassified an estimated 8 million pages of documents from the Office of Strategic Services (OSS), the Central Intelligence Agency (CIA), the Federal Bureau of Investigation (FBI), and Army intelligence. The group issued three reports to Congress between 1999 and 2007.

Some of the declassified documents center on reports of the Japanese exploitation of 'comfort women' before and during World War II, as well as the FBI and CIA's investigations of Adolf Hitler's possible survival after the war ended.

== History ==
The group was created by the Nazi War Crimes Disclosure Act, passed in 1998, and the Japanese Imperial Government Disclosure Act of 2000. Between 1999 and 2016, the working group declassified and opened to the public an estimated 8 million pages of documents, including 1.2 million pages of Office of Strategic Services records, over 100,000 pages of Central Intelligence Agency files, more than 350,000 pages of Federal Bureau of Investigation subject files, and nearly 300,000 pages of Army intelligence files. The IWG has issued three reports to Congress (in October 1999, March 2002, and April 2007) and it issues news releases and occasional newsletters.

On March 25, 2005, President George W. Bush signed into law legislation pushing back the group's sunset date to March 2007. Documents related to the project have been released as late as 2017.

== Summary ==
=== Nazi War Crimes ===
Documents declassified under the Nazi War Crimes Disclosure Act, which began to be released online by the early 2010s, included hundreds of pages of documents compiled by the FBI and CIA in relation to the health, psychological profile, and possible survival of Adolf Hitler following the end of World War II in Europe (when Western scholars believe he died by suicide). One report to the CIA included a purported photograph of Hitler in Colombia, South America, the authenticity of which the agency did not endorse. Additional documents related to Hitler's possible survival were released in late 2017 along with files related to the investigation of the assassination of John F. Kennedy.

=== Japanese Imperial Government ===
Agencies were advised that particular attention should be given to locating any records related to "so-called 'comfort women' program, the Japanese systematic enslavement of women of subject populations for sexual purposes." However, the IWG expressed its disappointments because the IWG uncovered and released few Asian theatre records. Thus, the IWG apologized to the Global Alliance for Preserving the History of WWII in Asia which was involved in the commencement of this project.

The IWG published a report titled Researching Japanese War Crimes, Introductory Essays. In the report, the IWG analyzed the reason why comfort women documents were scarce:

Licensed prostitution was legal in prewar Japan, and Allied officials viewed the small part of the overseas system they uncovered as an extension of homeland practices. Prosecuting Japanese soldiers for rape, a notorious crime everywhere the army set foot, took precedence over investigating the circumstances of "comfort women," who were seen as professional prostitutes, not as unwilling victims coerced into brothels by employees of the Japanese military.

The report further stated that this practice was not charged with criminal acts:

In part to reduce local resentment against Japan and in part to prevent the spread of venereal disease among its ranks, the Japanese military contracted private vendors to set up "comfort stations" for the troops as early as 1932. Again, this practice was known to the Allies but no criminal charges were filed at the trials.

There was one exception, for an offense occurring in the Dutch East Indies.

== Research cost and scale ==
As of 2007, the IWG estimated that the implementation of the two Disclosure Acts costed $30 million. From a total of 620 million pages, U.S. Government agencies screened over 100 million pages for relevance under the NWCDA and screened over 17 million pages under the JIGDA. Only a small percentage of these screened pages were found to be responsive to the Disclosure Acts: nearly 8.5 million pages of documents were relevant to the NWCDA, and over 142,000 pages were relevant to the JIGDA.

== Membership ==
The members of the group are appointed by the president. Members include:

- Steven Garfinkel, Chair
- Thomas Baer, head of Steinhardt Baer Pictures Company
- Richard Ben-Veniste, a partner at Mayer Brown
- Christina Bromwell, Office of the Secretary of Defense
- Elizabeth Holtzman, former Congresswoman from New York
- William Hooton, Federal Bureau of Investigation
- William H. Leary, National Security Council
- Eli Rosenbaum, Director of the Office of Special Investigations, Department of Justice
- Paul Shapiro, Director, Center for Advanced Holocaust Studies, United States Holocaust Memorial Museum
- Marc J. Susser, The Historian, Department of State
- Mary Walsh, Central Intelligence Agency
