= Dying to Tell =

2018 documentary film by Hernán Zin

- Morir para contar
- Directed by: Hernán Zin
- Written by: Hernán Zin
- Starring: Hernán Zin
- Distributed by: Netflix
- Release dates: 22 June 2018 (Shanghai International Film Festival); 17 May 2019
- Running time: 87 minutes
- Country: Spain
- Languages: English, Spanish, Arabic

Dying to Tell (Spanish: Morir para contar) is a 2018 Spanish documentary film directed and written by, as well as starring, Hernán Zin.

The film was released by Netflix on 17 May 2019.

== Premise ==
The documentary is journalism on the life of some Spanish war journalists. It initially focuses on Hernán Zin, but later turns its focus on Zin's fellow Spanish war correspondents who have experienced atrocities or the death of colleagues or have been held hostage. It talks about such events as the disappearance of Antonio Pampliega, José Manuel López and Ángel Sastre, the disappearance and death of Julio Fuentes Serrano, the death of Miguel Gil Moreno de Mora, or one of the 2014 Gaza war beach bombing incidents, among other similar tragedies and situations.

== Cast ==
- Hernán Zin
- Ángel Sastre
- Manu Brabo (photojournalist)
- Roberto Fraile
- Maysun (photojournalist)
- David Beriáin
- Fran Sevilla (RNE)
- Gervasio Sánchez
- José Antonio Guardiola (TVE)
- Eduard Sanjuán (TV3)
- Mónica G. Prieto
- Javier Espinosa (El Mundo)
- Rosa María Calaf
- Rosa Meneses (El Mundo)
- Julio Fuentes Serrano
- Ramón Lobo
- José Luis Márquez (news cameraman)
- Carlos Hernández
- Carmen Sarmiento
- Ricardo Garcia Vilanova (photojournalist)
- Eric Frattini
- Mònica Bernabé
- Miguel Gil Moreno de Mora (APTN producer and news cameraman)
- Patrocinio Macián (mother of Miguel Gil - voice only)
- Santiago Lyon (photojournalist for AP)

== Awards ==
- Best Documentary, Documentaries of the World Section, 2018 Montreal World Film Festival
- Best Documentary, Doc España Section, 2018 Valladolid International Film Festival (SEMINCI)
