= ODESSA =

Possible Nazi underground escape plan

ODESSA is an American codename (from the German: Organisation der ehemaligen SS-Angehörigen, meaning: Organization of Former SS Members) coined in 1946 to cover Nazi underground escape-plans made at the end of World War II by a group of SS officers with the aim of facilitating secret escape routes, and any directly ensuing arrangements. The concept of the existence of an actual ODESSA organisation has circulated widely in fictional spy novels and movies, including Frederick Forsyth's best-selling 1972 thriller The Odessa File. The escape-routes have become known as ratlines. Known goals of elements within the SS included allowing SS members to escape to Argentina or to the Middle East under false passports.

Although an unknown number of wanted Nazis and war criminals escaped Germany and often Europe, most experts deny that an organisation called ODESSA ever existed. The term itself is only recorded certainly as an American construction, coined to cover a range of planning, arrangements, including those enacted and those simply envisaged, and both known and hypothesised groups. There has been and remains some confusion over the years of the use of the term ODESSA. About 300 Nazis found their way to Argentina with support from Juan Perón after he was democratically elected president of Argentina in 1946.

Author Uki Goñi maintains that archival evidence paints a picture that "does not even include an organization actually named Odessa, but it is sinister nonetheless, and weighted in favour of an actual organized escape network." Historian Guy Walters, in his 2009 book Hunting Evil, stated he was unable to find any evidence of the existence of the ODESSA network as such, although numerous other organisations such as Konsul, Scharnhorst, Sechsgestirn, Leibwache, and Lustige Brüder have been named, including Die Spinne ("The Spider") run in part by Hitler's commando-chief Otto Skorzeny. Historian Daniel Stahl in a 2011 essay stated that the consensus among historians is that an organisation called ODESSA did not actually exist.

Goñi's book The Real Odessa describes the role of Juan Perón in providing cover for Nazi war criminals with cooperation from the Vatican, the Argentinian government and Swiss authorities through a secret office set up by Perón's agents in Bern. Heinrich Himmler's secret service had prepared an escape-route in Madrid in 1944. In 1946, this operation moved to the Presidential palace in Buenos Aires. Goñi states that the operation stretched from Scandinavia to Italy, aiding war criminals and bringing in gold that the Croatian treasury had stolen.

== Origins of the term ==
The codeword Odessa—as used by the Allies—appeared for the first time in a memo dated 3 July 1946, by the United States Army Counterintelligence Corps (CIC) whose principal role was to screen displaced persons for possible suspects. The CIC discovered that ODESSA was used at the KZ Bensheim-Auerbach internment camp for SS prisoners who used this watchword in their secret attempts to gain special privileges from the International Red Cross, wrote historian Guy Walters. Neither the Americans nor the British were able to verify the claims extending any further than that.

== History ==
According to Simon Wiesenthal, the ODESSA was set up in 1944 to aid fugitive Nazis. However, a documentary produced by the German TV station ZDF also suggested that the ODESSA was never the single world-wide secret organisation that Wiesenthal described, but several organisations, both overt and covert, that helped ex-SS men. The truth may have been obscured by antagonism between the Wiesenthal Organisation and West German military intelligence. It is known that Austrian authorities were investigating the organization several years before Wiesenthal went public with his information.

Similarly, historian Gitta Sereny wrote in her book Into That Darkness (1974), based on interviews with the former commandant of the Treblinka extermination camp, Franz Stangl, that an organisation called ODESSA had never existed although there were Nazi aid organisations:

The prosecutors at the Ludwigsburg Central Authority for the Investigation into Nazi Crimes, who know precisely how the postwar lives of certain individuals now living in South America have been financed, have searched all their thousands of documents from beginning to end, but say they are totally unable to authenticate (the) 'Odessa.' Not that this matters greatly: there certainly were various kinds of Nazi aid organisations after the war—it would have been astonishing if there hadn't been.

This view is supported by historian Guy Walters in his book Hunting Evil, where he also indicates networks were used, but there was not such a thing as a setup network covering Europe and South America, with an alleged war treasure. For Walters, the reports received by the allied intelligence services during the mid-1940s suggest that the appellation ODESSA was "little more than a catch-all term used by former Nazis who wished to continue the fight."

Nazi concentration camp supervisors denied the existence of an organisation called ODESSA. The US War Crimes Commission reports and the American Office of Strategic Services neither confirmed nor denied claims about the existence of such an organisation. Wechsberg, who after emigrating to the United States had served as an OSS officer and member of the US War Crimes Commission, however, claimed that in interviews of outspoken German anti-Nazis some asserted that plans were made for a Fourth Reich before the fall of the Third, and that this was to be implemented by reorganising in remote Nazi colonies overseas: "The Nazis decided that the time had come to set up a world-wide clandestine escape network."

They used Germans who had been hired to drive U.S. Army trucks on the autobahn between Munich and Salzburg for the 'Stars and Stripes', the American Army newspaper. The couriers had applied for their jobs under false names, and the Americans in Munich had failed to check them carefully... (the) ODESSA was organized as a thorough, efficient network... Anlaufstellen (ports of call) were set up along the entire Austro-German border... In Lindau, close to both Austria and Switzerland, (the) ODESSA set up an 'export-import' company with representatives in Cairo and Damascus.

In his interviews with Sereny, Stangl denied any knowledge of a group called the ODESSA. Recent biographies of Adolf Eichmann, who also escaped to South America, and Heinrich Himmler, the alleged founder of the ODESSA, made no reference to such an organisation. In her book Eichmann in Jerusalem, Hannah Arendt states that "in 1950, [Eichmann] succeeded in establishing contact with ODESSA, a clandestine organisation of SS veterans, and in May of that year, he was passed through Austria to Italy, where a priest, fully informed of his identity, equipped him with a refugee passport in the name of Richard Klement and sent him on to Buenos Aires." Notorious Auschwitz doctor Josef Mengele also escaped to Argentina, and later fled to Paraguay and finally Brazil.

Sereny attributed the escape of SS members to postwar chaos and the inability of the Catholic Church, the Red Cross and the United States Armed Forces to verify the claims of people who came to them for help, rather than to the activities of an underground Nazi organisation. She identified a Vatican official, Bishop Aloïs Hudal, not former SS men, as the principal agent in helping Nazis leave Italy for South America, mainly Brazil.

Of particular importance in examining the postwar activities of high-ranking Nazis was Paul Manning's book Martin Bormann: Nazi in Exile, which detailed Martin Bormann's rise to power through the Nazi Party and as Hitler's Chief of Staff. During the war, Manning himself was a correspondent for CBS News in London, and his reporting and subsequent researches presented Bormann's cunning and skill in the organisation and planning for the flight of Nazi-controlled capital from Europe during the last years of the war—notwithstanding the strong possibility of Bormann's death in Berlin on 1 May 1945, especially in light of DNA identification in 1998 of skeletal remains unearthed near the Lehrter Bahnhof in 1972 as Bormann's.

According to Manning, "eventually, over 10,000 former German military made it to South America along escape routes set up by (the) ODESSA and the Deutsche Hilfsverein...". The ODESSA itself was incidental, says Manning, with the continuing existence of the Bormann Organisation a much larger and more menacing fact. None of this had yet been convincingly proven.

== ODESSA as myth ==
German historian Heinz Schneppen has examined an idea of ODESSA as a myth, or inflation of real circumstances (which remained largely unknown for a long time), suggesting reasons why such a phenomenon may become popular. He emphasized both the dashed dreams of fervent Nazis, and the horrible nightmares of Nazi victims. He suggested both impulses sustained a belief in a false myth, also conflating within that American government interest in delegitimizing the Perón regime.

== In popular culture ==
In the realm of fiction, Frederick Forsyth's best-selling thriller The Odessa File (1972) brought the organisation to popular attention. (The novel was turned into a film starring Jon Voight.) In the novel, Forsyth's ODESSA smuggled war criminals to South America, but also attempted to protect those SS members who remained behind in Germany, and plotted to influence political decisions in West Germany. Many of the novel's readers assumed that ODESSA really existed.

In the thriller novel by Ira Levin titled The Boys from Brazil (1976), Dr. Josef Mengele, the concentration camp medical doctor who performed horrific experiments on camp victims during World War II, is involved in ODESSA. According to a young man and spy on his trail, Mengele is activating the Kameradenwerk for a strange assignment: he is sending out six Nazis (former SS officers) to kill 94 men, who share a few common traits. In the book, the terms Kameradenwerk and ODESSA are used interchangeably. The novel was adapted into a 1978 film.

The BBC TV Serial Kessler is a fictional account of the uncovering by investigative journalists and western intelligence agencies of the ODESSA-like Kameradenwerk organisation responsible for the escape and support of Nazis after the war. It features a fictionalised version of Dr. Josef Mengele and other Nazis in hiding in Paraguay.

During the Watergate scandal, G. Gordon Liddy referred to the White House Plumbers as ODESSA in reference to the Nazi organization.

It was mentioned in three Phoenix Force novels: Ultimate Terror (1984), The Twisted Cross (1986) and Terror In The Dark (1987). It was also mentioned, sometimes in veiled terms, in Philip Kerr's 2006 novel, The One from the Other—one of Kerr's Bernie Gunther mysteries. Novelist Eric Frattini has emphasised his belief in ODESSA and incorporates elements in his novels, such as the 2010 thriller, The Mephisto's Gold.

The horror tabletop role-playing game Delta Green has the faction Karotechia, a network of former Nazi occultists operating after World War II, drawing inspiration from ODESSA and other alleged Nazi escape organizations. Within the setting, ODESSA itself also exists as a Nazi escape network, but is depicted as being under the Karotechia's control.

During the confession sequence of the first episode of Archer's 5th season, Dr. Krieger mentions ODESSA and ratlines, affirming him being a reference to The Boys from Brazil.

The First Order, the main antagonists from the Star Wars sequel trilogy, were based on the concept of ODESSA, in particular the theory that several Nazis escaped into Argentina.

Bormann's survival and the ratline are also part of the History Channel TV series Hunting Hitler (2015–2018) in which former CIA agent Bob Baer, Gerrard Williams (author of Grey Wolf: The Escape of Adolf Hitler) and Tim Kennedy, a former member of the 7th Special Forces Group of the US Army, try to prove that Hitler might have survived WWII and fled to Argentina.

ODESSA and another secret society was mentioned in Terry Hayes' novel I Am Pilgrim. In the novel, the main character, disguised as an FBI agent in Damascus, is searching for a secret passage and encounters a tunnel with German inscriptions. Names of SS military personnel involved with the construction of the tunnel are listed.

ODESSA serves as the main antagonist in the Blake and Mortimer comic The Curse of the Thirty Denarii, in which ODESSA members hunt for the 30 pieces of silver given to Judas in exchange for betraying Jesus, believing it will help them take over the world.

== See also ==
- David Emory
- Die Spinne
- HIAG
- Nazi gold
- Secretaría de Inteligencia (SIDE)
- Special Intelligence Service (SIS), a secret FBI intelligence agency operating in South America during and immediately after World War II
- U.S. DOJ Office of Special Investigations (OSI)
- Werwolf

== General and cited references ==
- d'Erizans, Alexander Peter. "Review of Schneppen, Heinz, Odessa und das Vierte Reich: Mythen der Zeitgeschichte". H-German, H-Net Reviews (August 2011). online
- Goñi, Uki (2002): The Real Odessa: Smuggling the Nazis to Perón's Argentina. New York; London: Granta Books. ISBN 1-86207-581-6 (hardcover); ISBN 1-86207-552-2 (paperback, 2003)
- Eric Frattini (2011): El Oro de Mefisto. Madrid, Espasa-Calpe.
- Infield, Glenn (1981) Secrets of the SS. New York: Stein and Day.
- Lee, Martin A. (1997): The Beast Reawakens. Boston, MA: Little, Brown and Company.
- Manning, Paul (1980) Martin Bormann: Nazi in Exile. Lyle Stuart, Inc., also available online.
- Martinez, Félix; Nando Garcia (30 October 2005). "A la caza del ultimo Nazi". El Mundo.
- Sereny, Gitta (1974): Into That Darkness: From Mercy Killings to Mass Murder. Republished (1983) as Into That Darkness: An Examination of Conscience. New York: Vintage.
- Stahl, Daniel. "Odessa und das 'Nazigold' in Südamerika: Mythen und ihre Bedeutungen" ('Odessa and "Nazi Gold" in South America: Myths and Their Meanings') Jahrbuch für Geschichte Lateinamerikas (2011), Vol. 48, pp. 333–360.
- Wechsberg, Joseph (1967): The Murderers Among Us. New York: McGraw Hill.
