= Islamic terrorism =

Terrorist acts by groups of individuals who profess Islamic motivations or goals

Islamic terrorism (Note: Also known as Islamist terrorism, radical Islamic terrorism or jihadist terrorism. Not to be confused with Islamism.), or Islamic political violence, is a form of religious terrorism, or religion-based political violence or militancy, carried out by fundamentalist militant Islamists and Islamic extremists with the aim of achieving various political or religious objectives, such as jihad and caliphate.

Since at least the 1990s, Islamist terrorist incidents have occurred around the world and targeted both Muslims and non-Muslims. Most attacks have been concentrated in Muslim-majority countries, with studies finding 80–90% of terrorist victims to be Muslim.

The annual number of fatalities from terrorist attacks grew sharply from 2011 to 2014, when it reached a peak of 33,438, before declining to 13,826 in 2019. From 1979 to April 2024, five Islamic extremist groups—the Taliban, Islamic State, Boko Haram, al-Shabaab, and al-Qaeda—were responsible for more than 80% of all victims of Islamist terrorist attacks. In some of the worst-affected Muslim-majority regions, these terrorists have been met by armed, independent resistance groups. Islamist terrorism has also been roundly condemned by prominent Islamic figures and groups.

Justifications given for attacks on civilians by Islamic extremist groups come from their interpretations of the Quran, the hadith, and Sharia. These killings include retribution by armed jihad for the perceived injustices of unbelievers against Muslims; the belief that many self-proclaimed Muslims have violated Islamic law and are disbelievers (takfir); the perceived necessity of restoring Islam by establishing Sharia as the source of law, including by reestablishing the Caliphate as a pan-Islamic state (e.g., ISIS); the glory and heavenly rewards of martyrdom (istishhad); and the belief in the supremacy of Islam over all other religions. (Note: which is encapsulated in the formula "Islam is exalted and nothing is exalted above it". Also, the World Assembly of Muslim Youth "has publicly stated that one of its educational goals is to arm the Muslim youth with full confidence in the supremacy of the Islamic system over other systems.") Justification of violence without permitted declarations of takfir (excommunication) has been criticized.

The use of the phrase "Islamic terrorism" is disputed. In Western political speech, it has variously been called "counter-productive", "highly politicized, intellectually contestable" and "damaging to community relations", by those who disapprove of the characterization 'Islamic'. It has been argued that "Islamic terrorism" is a misnomer for what should be called "Islamist terrorism".

Tactics employed include kidnappings, sexual enslavement, public executions and suicide bombings, with followers urged to use "guns, bombs, vehicles, knives or a combination of methods to increase casualties."

== Terminology ==
George W. Bush and Tony Blair (US president and UK Prime Minister respectively at the time of the September 11 attacks) repeatedly stated that the war against terrorism has nothing to do with Islam. Others inside and out of the Islamic world who oppose its use on the grounds there is no connection between Islam and terrorism include Imran Khan, the prime minister of Pakistan, and academic Bruce Lawrence. Former US president Barack Obama explained why he used the term "terrorism" rather than "Islamic terrorism" in a 2016 town hall meeting saying, "There is no doubt, ... terrorist organizations like Al-Qaeda or ISIL – They have perverted and distorted and tried to claim the mantle of Islam for an excuse for basically barbarism and death ... But what I have been careful about when I describe these issues is to make sure that we do not lump these murderers into the billion Muslims that exist around the world ..."

It has been argued that "Islamic terrorism" is a misnomer for what should be called "Islamist terrorism".

In January 2008, the US Department of Homeland Security Office for Civil Rights and Civil Liberties issued a report titled Terminology to Define the Terrorists: Recommendations from American Muslims, which opened with

Words matter. The terminology that senior government officials use must accurately identify the nature of the challenges that face our generation. [...] At the same time, the terminology should also be strategic – it should avoid helping the terrorists by inflating the religious bases and glamorous appeal of their ideology.

The office "consulted with some of the leading U.S.-based scholars and commentators on Islam to discuss the best terminology to use when describing the terrorist threat." Among the experts they consulted,

There was a consensus that the [US Government] should avoid unintentionally portraying terrorists, who lack moral and religious legitimacy, as brave fighters, legitimate soldiers, or spokesmen for ordinary Muslims. Therefore, the experts counseled caution in using terms such as, "jihadist," "Islamic terrorist," "Islamist," and "holy warrior" as grandiose descriptions.

== History ==
Growth in Islamist attacks and killings around the world

- Attacks
- Deaths

A 2024 study by the Fondation pour l’innovation politique recorded 66,872 Islamist terrorist attacks worldwide between 1979 and April 2024, causing at least 249,941 deaths. The study found that attacks increased sharply after 2013, with 56,413 attacks recorded between 2013 and April 2024, representing 84.4% of the total recorded since 1979. It also found that 96.7% of attacks occurred in the Middle East and North Africa, South Asia, and Sub-Saharan Africa.

=== Pre-20th century ===
Whether Islamic terrorism is a recent phenomenon is disputed. Some maintain that there was no terrorism in Islam prior to late 20th and early 21st century, while others, such as Ibn Warraq, claim that from the beginning of Islam, "violent movements have arisen" such as the Kharijites, Sahl ibn Salama, Barbahari, Kadizadeli movement, Ibn Abd al-Wahhab, etc., "seeking to revive true Islam, which its members felt had been neglected in Muslim societies, who were not living up to the ideals of the earliest Muslims". The 7th century Kharijites, according to some, started from an essentially political position but developed extreme doctrines that set them apart from both mainstream Sunni and Shi'a Muslims. The group was particularly noted for adopting a radical approach to takfir, whereby they declared Muslim opponents to be unbelievers and therefore worthy of death, and also by their strong resemblance to contemporary ISIL.

=== 1960s–1970s ===
During the era of the anti-colonial struggle in North Africa and the Middle East, coinciding with the creation of Israel in 1948, a series of Marxist-Leninist and anti-imperialist movements swept throughout the Arab and Islamic world. These movements were nationalist and revolutionary, but not Islamic. However, their view that terrorism could be effective in reaching their political goals generated the first phase of modern international terrorism. In the late 1960s, Palestinian secular movements such as Al Fatah and the Popular Front for the Liberation of Palestine (PFLP) began to target civilians outside the immediate arena of conflict. Following Israel's victory over Arab forces in 1967, Palestinian leaders began to realize that the Arab world was unable to defeat Israel in the battlefield. At the same time, lessons drawn from the Jewish struggle against the British in Palestine and revolutionary movements across Latin America, North Africa and Southeast Asia, motivated the Palestinians to turn away from guerrilla warfare towards urban terrorism. These movements were secular in nature, though their international reach served to spread terrorist tactics worldwide. Moreover, the Arab Cold War between mostly US-aligned conservative Islamic monarchies (Morocco, Saudi Arabia, Jordan) and Soviet-aligned secular national-revolutionary governments (Egypt, Syria, Algeria, Libya, Iraq) inspired a growth of religiously motivated Islamic movements in the Middle East, supported by Saudi Arabia, which came into conflict with the predominant secular (Nasserist and Ba'athist) nationalist ideologies at the time.

The book The Revolt by Menachem Begin, leader of the Irgun militia and future Israeli Prime Minister, influenced both Carlos Marighella's urban guerrilla theory and Osama bin Laden's Islamist al-Qaeda organization. Israeli journalist Ronen Bergman in the book Rise and Kill First asserted that Hezbollah's 1983 campaign of coordinated terrorist attacks against American, French and Israeli military installations in Beirut drew inspiration from and directly mirrored the Haganah's and Irgun's 1946 bombing campaign against the British: both succeeded in creating an atmosphere of widespread fear which eventually forced the enemy to withdraw. Bergman further asserts that the influence of Israeli-sponsored terrorist operations on the emerging Islamists was also of operational nature: the Israeli proxy Front for the Liberation of Lebanon from Foreigners had carried out multiple deadly truck bombings in Lebanon long before the emergence of Hezbollah. An Israeli Mossad agent told Bergman: "I saw from a distance one of the cars blowing up and demolishing an entire street. We were teaching the Lebanese how effective a car bomb could be. Everything that we saw later with Hezbollah sprang from what they saw had happened after these operations."

The year 1979 is widely considered a turning point in the rise of religiously motivated radicalism in the Muslim world. Several events are thought to be crucial for the proliferation of Islamist terrorism in the next decade, such as the Soviet–Afghan War and unprecedented support from Saudi Arabia, Pakistan and the US for anti-Soviet jihadists; the Iranian Revolution and subsequent Iran–Iraq War as well as Khomeini's active support for Shia groups fighting the Israeli occupation of Lebanon; the Grand Mosque seizure in Mecca and subsequent Wahhabization of the Saudi government; and the Egypt–Israel peace treaty that was highly unpopular in some sections of the Muslim world.

According to Bruce Hoffman of the RAND Corporation, in 1980, 2 out of 64 terrorist groups were categorized as having religious motivation while in 1995, almost half (26 out of 56) were religiously motivated with the majority having Islam as their guiding force.

=== 1980s–1990s ===
The Soviet–Afghan War and the subsequent anti-Soviet mujahedin war, lasting from 1979 to 1989, started the rise and expansion of terrorist groups. Since their beginning in 1994, the Pakistani-supported Taliban militia in Afghanistan has gained several characteristics traditionally associated with state-sponsors of terrorism, providing logistical support, travel documentation, and training facilities. Since 1989 the increasing willingness of religious extremists to strike targets outside immediate country or regional areas highlights the global nature of contemporary terrorism. The 1993 bombing of the World Trade Center, and the 11 September 2001 attacks on the World Trade Center and Pentagon, are representative of this trend.

=== 2000s–2010s ===
According to research by the German newspaper Welt am Sonntag, between 11 September 2001 and 21 April 2019, there were 31,221 Islamist terrorism attacks, in which at least 146,811 people were killed. Many of the victims were Muslims, including most of the victims who were killed in attacks involving 12 or more deaths.

=== 2010s ===
According to the Global Terrorism Index, deaths from terrorism peaked in 2014 and have fallen each year since then until 2019 (the last year the study had numbers for), making a decline of more than half (59% or 13,826 deaths) from their peak. The five countries "hardest hit" by terrorism continue to be Muslim countries—Afghanistan, Iraq, Nigeria, Syria and Somalia. (Note: An indication that Islamic terrorism has at least paced the general decline in deaths from terror is that "one of the more worrying trends" in terrorism over the five year period from 2014–2019, is (non-Islamic) far-right terrorism.)

In 2016, four out of the five most violent groups in the world were Islamist extremists. These groups carried out 88% of the 2,916 attacks and caused 99% of the 14,017 deaths by the top five groups.

== Attacker profiles and motivations ==
The motivation of Islamic terrorists has been disputed. Some (such as Maajid Nawaz, Graeme Wood, and Ibn Warraq) attribute it to extremist interpretations of Islam; others (Mehdi Hasan) to some combination of political grievance and social-psychological maladjustment; and still others (such as James L. Payne and Michael Scheuer) to a struggle against "U.S./Western/Jewish aggression, oppression, and exploitation of Muslim lands and peoples".

=== Religious motivation ===
Daniel Benjamin and Steven Simon, in their book, The Age of Sacred Terror, argue that Islamic terrorist attacks are motivated by religious fervor. They are seen as "a sacrament ... intended to restore to the universe a moral order that had been corrupted by the enemies of Islam." Their attacks are neither political nor strategic but an "act of redemption" meant to "humiliate and slaughter those who defied the hegemony of God".

According to Indonesian Islamic leader Yahya Cholil Staquf in a 2017 Time interview, within the classical Islamic tradition, the relationship between Muslims and non-Muslims is assumed to be one of segregation and enmity. In his view, extremism and terrorism are linked with "the basic assumptions of Islamic orthodoxy" and that radical Islamic movements are nothing new. He also added that Western politicians should stop pretending that extremism is not linked to Islam.

According to journalist Graeme Wood "much of what" one major Islamic terror group -- ISIS -- "does looks nonsensical except in light of a sincere, carefully considered commitment to returning civilization to a seventh-century legal environment" of Muhammad and his companions, "and ultimately to bringing about the apocalypse" and Judgement day. ISIS group members insist "they will not—cannot—waver from governing precepts that were embedded in Islam by the Prophet Muhammad and his earliest followers".

Shmuel Bar argues that while the importance of political and socioeconomic factors in Islamist terrorism is not in doubt, "In order to comprehend the motivation for these acts and to draw up an effective strategy for a war against terrorism, it is necessary to understand the religious-ideological factors — which are deeply embedded in Islam."

Examining Europe, two studies of the background of Muslim terrorists—one from the UK and one from France—found little connection between terrorist acts performed in the name of Islam and the religious piety of the operatives. A "restricted" 2008 UK report of hundreds of case studies by the domestic counter-intelligence agency MI5 found that there was no "typical profile" of a terrorist and that

Far from being religious zealots, a large number of those involved in terrorism do not practise their faith regularly. Many lack religious literacy and could actually be regarded as religious novices. Very few have been brought up in strongly religious households, and there is a higher than average proportion of converts. Some are involved in drug-taking, drinking alcohol and visiting prostitutes. MI5 says there is evidence that a well-established religious identity actually protects against violent radicalisation.

However, while the motivations of the individuals directly involved in carrying out the terror attacks are not necessarily religious and may stem from other reasons, religiously motivated organizations and governments are very often behind such attacks. Fundamentalist organizations and governments often encourage, fund, assist, incentivize, or reward the actions of individuals they recognize as susceptible to being coerced into committing terror attacks, thus using people who are not always religiously motivated to achieve religious ends. Hamas, for example, is known for paying the families of imprisoned terrorists and of suicide bombers. The Islamic Republic of Iran intends billions of US dollars annually for militia fighters and terrorists, exploiting the extreme economic difficulties faced by people in countries such as Yemen, Lebanon and Syria by offering them cash in exchange for terror activity.

A 2015 "general portrait" of "the conditions and circumstances" under which people living in France become "Islamic radicals" (terrorists or would-be terrorists) by Olivier Roy (see above) found radicalisation was not an "uprising of a Muslim community that is victim to poverty and racism: only young people join, including converts".

Roy believes terrorism/radicalism is "expressed in religious terms" because

1. most of the radicals have a Muslim background, which makes them open to a process of re-Islamisation ("almost none of them having been pious before entering the process of radicalisation"), and
2. jihad is "the only cause on the global market". If you kill in silence, it will be reported by the local newspaper; "if you kill yelling 'Allahu Akbar', you are sure to make the national headlines". Other extreme causes—ultra-left or radical ecology—are "too bourgeois and intellectual" for the radicals.

Somewhat in contradiction to this, a study surveying Muslims in Europe to examine how much Islamist ideology increases support for terrorism found that "in Western countries affected by homegrown terrorism ... justifying terrorism is strongly associated with an increase in religious practice". (This is not the case in European "countries where Muslims are predominant"—Bosnia, Albania, etc.—where the opposite seems to be true, i.e., the more importance respondents assigned to religion in their life, the less likely they were to "justifying political violence".)

==== Denominations/Ideologies ====
Most strains of thought/schools/sects/movements/denominations/traditions of Islam do not support or otherwise associate themselves with terrorism. (Note: Shia Muslims have been involved in violence primarily at the state level (Hezbollah attacks on Israeli targets and Iran's use of shaheeds against Saddam Hussien's Iraq for example). The small Quranist (Muslims who follow only Quran) and Ahmadi groups (who believe jihad should be peaceful) have "zero history of violence".) According to Mir Faizal, only three sects or movements of Islam—the Sunni sects of Salafi, Deobandi, and Barelvi. (Note: Faizal calls these groups "sects", Wikipedia calls them "movements".)—have been associated with violence against civilians. Of the three, only Salafi Islam—specifically Salafi jihadism Islam—can be called involved in global terrorism, as it is connected with Al-Qaeda, ISIS, Boko Haram and other groups. (Terrorism among some members of the Barelvi sect is limited to attacks on alleged blasphemers in Pakistan, and the terrorism among Deobandi groups has "almost no" influence beyond Afghanistan, Pakistan and India.) Another sect/movement known as Wahhabism (intertwined with non-jihadist Salafism) has been accused of being the ideology behind Islamic terrorist groups, but Al Qaeda and other terrorists are more commonly described as following a fusion of Qutbism and Wahhabism.

Outside of these sects or religious movements, the religious ideology of Qutbism has influenced Islamic terrorism, along with religious themes and trends including Takfir, suicide attacks, and the belief that Jews and Christians are not People of the Book but infidels/kafir waging "war on Islam". (These ideas are often related and overlapping.)

===== Qutbism =====
Qutbism is named after Egyptian Islamist theoretician Sayyid Qutb, who wrote a manifesto (known as Milestones), while in prison. Qutb is said to have laid out the ideological foundation of Salafi jihadism (according to Bruce Livesey); his ideas are said to have formed "the modern Islamist movement" (according to Gilles Kepel); (Note: Kepel wrote that "the modern Islamist movement" was "rebuilt" around "the ideas" of Qutb, rebuilt because the Muslim Brotherhood was crushed after 1954 by the regime of Gamal Abdel Nasser. In 1954 another a second unsuccessful assassination was attempted against Egypt's prime minister (Gamal Abdel Nasser), and blamed on the "secret apparatus" of the Brotherhood. The Brotherhood was again banned and this time thousands of its members were imprisoned.) which along with other "violent Islamic thought", became the ideology known as "Qutbism that is the "center of gravity" of al-Qaeda and related groups (according to U.S. Army Colonel Dale C. Eikmeier). Qutb is thought to be a major influence on Al-Qaeda #2 leader, Ayman al-Zawahiri. (Note: Qutbism has been used as a close relative, or variety of Salafi jihadism.)

In his manifesto (called "one of the most influential works in Arabic of the last half century"), Qutb preached:

- the absolute necessity of enforcement of sharia law ("even more necessary than the establishment of the Islamic belief", without which Islam does not exist);
- the need for violent jihad as well as preaching to bring back sharia law and spread Islam, (a vanguard "movement" will use "physical power and Jihad", to remove "material obstacles");
- that offensive jihad—attacking non-Muslim territory—ought not neglected by true Muslims in favor of defensive jihad, (this "diminish[s] the greatness of the Islamic way of life", and is the work of those who have been "defeated by the attacks of the treacherous Orientalists!" Muslims should not let lack of non-Muslim aggression stop them from waging Jihad to spread sharia law because "truth and falsehood cannot coexist on earth" in peace.
- a loathing of "the West" (a "rubbish heap ... filth ... hollow and worthless");
- ... which is deliberately undermining Islam (pursuing a "well-thought-out scheme" to "demolish the structure of Muslim society");
- ... despite the fact it "knows" it is inferior to Islam (It "knows that it does not possess anything which will satisfy its own conscience and justify its existence", so that when confronted with the "logic, beauty, humanity and happiness" of Islam, "the American people blush");
- and a loathing and hatred of Jews ("world Jewry, whose purpose is to eliminate ... the limitations imposed by faith and religion, so that Jews may penetrate into body politics of the whole world and then may be free to perpetuate their evil designs [such as] usury, the aim of which is that all the wealth of mankind end up in the hands of Jewish financial institutions ...").

Eikmeier summarizes the tenets of Qutbism as being:

- A belief that Muslims have deviated from true Islam and must return to "pure Islam" as originally practiced during the time of Muhammad.
- The path to that "pure Islam" is only through a literal and strict interpretation of the Quran and Hadith, along with implementation of Muhammad's commands.
- Muslims should interpret the original sources individually without being bound to follow the interpretations of Islamic scholars.
- Any interpretation of the Quran from a historical, contextual perspective is a corruption, and that the majority of Islamic history and the classical jurisprudential tradition is mere sophistry.

While Sayyid Qutb preached that all of the Muslim world had become apostate or jahiliyah, he did not specifically takfir or call for the execution of any apostates, even those governing non-sharia governments (Note: (Qutb wrote Milestones in prison and "died before he could fully explain his theories" and clear up "his use of the term jahiliyya and its dire consequence, takfir")) Qutb did however emphasize that "the organizations and authorities" of the putatively Muslim countries were irredeemably corrupt and evil and would have to be abolished by "physical power and Jihad", by a "vanguard" movement of true Muslims.

One who did argue this was Muhammad abd-al-Salam Faraj, the main theoretician of the Islamist group that assassinated Egyptian President Anwar Sadat. In his book Al-Farida al-gha'iba (The Neglected Duty), he cited a fatwa issued in 1303 CE by the celebrated strict medieval jurist Ibn Taymiyyah. He had ruled that fighting and killing of the Mongol invaders who were invading Syria was not only permitted but obligatory according to Sharia. This was because the Mongols did not follow sharia law, and so even though they had converted to Islam (Ibn Taymiyyah argued) they were not really Muslims. Faraj preached that rulers such as Anwar Sadat were "rebels against the Laws of God [the shari'ah]", and "apostates from Islam" who have preserved nothing of Islam except its name.

===== Wahabism/Salafism =====
Another Islamic movement accused of being involved in terrorism is known as Wahabism.

Sponsored by oil exporting power Saudi Arabia, Wahabism is deeply conservative and anti-revolutionary (its founder taught that Muslims are obliged to give unquestioned allegiance to their ruler, however imperfect, so long as he leads the community according to the laws of God), Nonetheless, this ideology and its sponsors have been accused of assisting terrorism both

- indirectly—by "creating" an environment from the late 1970s to 2010 that "supported the spread of extremist ideologies"; despite its conservatism, Wahhabism shares important doctrinal points with forms of Islamism—a strong "revulsion" against Western influences, a belief in strict implementation of injunctions and prohibitions of sharia law, an opposition to both Shia Islam and popular Islamic religious practices (the veneration of Muslim saints), and a belief in the importance of armed jihad.
- and directly—through inadvertent and intentional funding of terrorist groups and through its influence on at least two major terrorist groups -- the Taliban and the Islamic State.

Up until at least 2017 or so (when Saudi Crown Prince Muhammad bin Salman declared Saudi Arabia was returning to "moderate Islam"), Saudi Arabia spent many billions, not only through the Saudi government but through Islamic organizations, religious charities, and private sources, on dawah wahhabiya, i.e. spreading the Wahhabi interpretation of Islam, This funding incentivized Muslim "schools, book publishers, magazines, newspapers, or even governments" around the world to "shape their behavior, speech, and thought in such a way as to incur and benefit from Saudi largesse," and so propagate Wahhabi doctrines;

The hundreds of Islamic colleges and Islamic centers, over a thousand mosques and schools for Muslim children, it financed (Note: One estimate is that during the reign of King Fahd (1982 to 2005), over $75 billion was spent in efforts to spread Wahhabi Islam. The money was used to establish 200 Islamic colleges, 210 Islamic centers, 1,500 mosques, and 2,000 schools for Muslim children in Muslim and non-Muslim majority countries. According to diplomat and political scientist Dore Gold, this funding was for non-Muslim countries alone.) often featured Wahhabi-friendly curriculum and religious materials such as textbooks explaining that all forms of Islam except Wahhabism were deviation, or the twelfth grade Saudi text that "instructs students that it is a religious obligation to do 'battle' against infidels in order to spread the faith".

Wahhabi-friendly works distributed for free "financed by petroleum royalties" included those of Ibn Taymiyyah (author of the fatwa mentioned above against rulers who do not rule by sharia law).

Not least, the successful 1980–1990 jihad against Soviet occupation of Afghanistan—that inspired non-Afghan jihad veterans to continue jihad in their own country or others—benefited from billions of dollars in Saudi financing, as well as "weaponry and intelligence".

==== Religious interpretations ====
The "root cause" of Muslim terrorism is extremist ideology, according to Pakistani theologian Javed Ahmad Ghamidi, specifically the teachings that:

- "Only Muslims have the right to rule, non-Muslims are meant to be subjugated";
- "Modern nation states are unIslamic and constitute kufr (disbelief)";
- the only truly Islamic form of state is a unified Muslim Caliphate;
- "when Muslims obtain power they will overthrow non-Muslim governments and rule";
- "The punishment of kufr (disbelief) and irtidad (apostasy) is death and must be implemented".

Other authors have noted other elements of extremist Islamic ideology.

===== Martyrdom/Istishhad =====
Terror attacks requiring the death of the attacker are generally referred to as suicide attacks/bombings by the media, but when done by Islamists their perpetrators generally call such an attack Istishhad (or in English "martyrdom operation"), and the suicide attacker shahid (pl. shuhada, literally 'witness' and usually translated as 'martyr'). The idea being that the attacker died in order to testify his faith in God, for example while waging jihad bis saif (jihad by the sword). The term "suicide" is never used because Islam has strong strictures against taking one's own life.

According to author Sadakat Kadri, "the very idea that Muslims might blow themselves up for God was unheard of before 1983, and it was not until the early 1990s that anyone anywhere had tried to justify killing innocent Muslims who were not on a battlefield." After 1983 the process was limited among Muslims to Hezbollah and other Lebanese Shi'a factions for more than a decade.

Since then, the "vocabulary of martyrdom and sacrifice", videotaped pre-confession of faith by attackers have become part of "Islamic cultural consciousness", "instantly recognizable" to Muslims (according to Noah Feldman), while the tactic has spread through the Muslim world "with astonishing speed and on a surprising course".

First the targets were American soldiers, then mostly Israelis, including women and children. From Lebanon and Israel, the technique of suicide bombing moved to Iraq, where the targets have included mosques and shrines, and the intended victims have mostly been Shiite Iraqis. ... [In] Afghanistan, ... both the perpetrators and the targets are orthodox Sunni Muslims. Not long ago, a bombing in Lashkar Gah, the capital of Helmand Province, killed Muslims, including women, who were applying to go on pilgrimage to Mecca. Overall, the trend is definitively in the direction of Muslim-on-Muslim violence. By a conservative accounting, more than three times as many Iraqis have been killed by suicide bombings in just three year (2003–6) as have Israelis in ten (from 1996–2006). Suicide bombing has become the archetype of Muslim violence – not just to Westerners but also to Muslims themselves.

Jihadist comparisons of life and death

Below are jihadist statements comparing life and death:

- "We love death like our enemies love life" (Hamas leader Ismail Haniyeh on Al-Aqsa TV in 2014)
- "The Americans love Pepsi-Cola, we love death." (Afghan jihadist Maulana Inyadullah addressing a British reporter in 2001)
- "The world is but a passage ... what is called life in this world is not life but death" (Ayatollah Khomeini in 1977, commemorating his son's death)
- "...The sons of the land of the two holiest sites [Mecca and Medina] ... I say this to you, These youths love death as you love life" (Osama bin Laden addressing U.S. Secretary of Defense William Perry in 1996 fatwa)

===== Justification for killing noncombatants =====
Al-Qaeda justification for the killing of civilian bystanders following its first attack (see above) based on Ibn Taymiyyah's fatwa was described by author Lawrence Wright,

Ibn Taymiyyah had issued a historic fatwa: Anyone who aided the Mongols, who bought goods from them or sold to them or was merely standing near them, might be killed as well. If he is a good Muslim, he will go to Paradise; if he is bad, he will go to hell, and good riddance. Thus the dead tourist and the hotel worker [killed by Al-Qaeda] would find their proper reward.

An influential tract Management of Savagery (Idarat at-Tawahhush), explains away mass killing in part by the fact that even "if the whole umma [community of Muslims] perishes they would all be martyrs". Similarly, author Ali A. Rizvi has described the chat room reaction of a Taliban supporter to his (Rizvi's) condemnation of the 2014 Peshawar school massacre—that the 132 school children the Taliban slaughtered were "not dead" because they had been killed "in the way of God ... Don't call them dead. They are alive, but we don't perceive it" (citing, Quran 3:169 Never think of those martyred in the cause of Allah as dead. In fact, they are alive with their Lord, well provided for—), and maintaining that those whose Islamic faith is "pure" would not be upset with the Taliban's murder of children either.

===== "War against Islam" =====
A tenant of Qutbism and other militant Islamists is that Western policies and society are not just un-Islamic or exploitive, but actively anti-Islamic, or as it is sometimes described, waging a "War on Islam". Islamists (such as Qutb) often identify what they see as a historical struggle between Christianity and Islam, dating back as far as the Crusades, among other historical conflicts between practitioners of the two respective religions.

In 2006, Britain's then head of MI5 Eliza Manningham-Buller said of Al-Qaeda that it "has developed an ideology which claims that Islam is under attack, and needs to be defended". "This," she said "is a powerful narrative that weaves together conflicts from across the globe, presenting the West's response to varied and complex issues, from long-standing disputes such as Israel/Palestine and Kashmir to more recent events as evidence of an across-the-board determination to undermine and humiliate Islam worldwide." She said that the video wills of British suicide bombers made it clear that they were motivated by perceived worldwide and long-standing injustices against Muslims; an extreme and minority interpretation of Islam promoted by some preachers and people of influence; their interpretation as anti-Muslim of UK foreign policy, in particular the UK's involvement in Iraq and Afghanistan."

In his call for jihad, Osama bin Laden almost invariably described his enemies as aggressive and his action against them as defensive.

===== Enmity towards non-Muslims and LGBT+ =====
The enmity towards non-Muslims among Islamist militants, leaders and scholars is driven by theological beliefs that deem Christians and Jews as "infidels". This hostility is further extended to Western society due to its secular values and practices, which are viewed as contrary to Islamic principles. These include issues such as the proliferation of pornography, perceived immorality, and the acceptance of homosexuality and feminism.

An example of this ideological stance in practice was provided by Karam Kuhdi, an Islamist arrested in Egypt in 1981 for his involvement in a series of robberies and murders targeting Christian goldsmiths. In this period, tourists, often non-Muslim, were also frequently targeted by Islamic terrorists in Egypt. During police interrogation, Kuhdi surprised authorities with his unconventional beliefs. He rejected the traditional Islamic doctrine that Christians were "People of the Book" entitled to protection as dhimmis, instead considering them infidels subject to violent jihad. Kuhdi supported his stance by citing Quranic verses such as 'Those who say that God is Jesus, son of Mary, are infidels' and 'combat those of the people of the book who are infidels', explaining the Islamists view that the infidels are "the People of the Book, since they have not believed in this book".

According to a doctrine known as al-wala' wa al-bara' (literally, "loyalty and disassociation"), Wahhabi founder Abd al-Wahhab argued that it was "imperative for Muslims not to befriend, ally themselves with, or imitate non-Muslims or heretical Muslims", and that this "enmity and hostility of Muslims toward non-Muslims and heretical had to be visible and unequivocal".

Although bin Laden almost always emphasized the alleged oppression of Muslims by America and Jews when talking about the need for jihad in his messages, in his "Letter to America", he answered the question, "What are we calling you to, and what do we want from you?" with:

We call you to be a people of manners, principles, honour, and purity; to reject the immoral acts of fornication, homosexuality, intoxicants, gambling's, and trading with interest (...) You separate religion from your policies, (...) You are the nation that permits Usury, which has been forbidden by all the religions (...) You are a nation that permits the production, trading and usage of intoxicants (...) You are a nation that permits acts of immorality (...) You are a nation that permits gambling in its all forms. (...) You use women to serve passengers, visitors, and strangers to increase your profit margins. You then rant that you support the liberation of women.

This principle has been emphasized by Ayman al-Zawahiri (leader of al-Qaeda since June 2011), Abu Muhammad al-Maqdisi (Jihadi theorist), Hamoud al-Aqla al-Shu'aybi (conservative Sudi scholar who supported the 9/11 attacks), and a number of Salafi preachers, Ahmad Musa Jibril, Abdullah el-Faisal.

Following the 2016 Orlando nightclub shooting, described as an "act of hate" and an "act of terror by President Barack Obama due to the victims being customers of an LGBT nightclub, allegedly targeted in retaliation for American airstrikes against ISIS. According to the Clarion Project, the official ISIS magazine Dabiq responded: "A hate crime? Yes. Muslims undoubtedly hate liberalist sodomites. An act of terrorism? Most definitely. Muslims have been commanded to terrorize the disbelieving enemies of Allah". During the shooting, the shooter said it was an act of retaliation for the airstrike killing of Abu Waheeb and three other alleged militants the previous month. He told the negotiator to tell America to stop the bombing. His words were: "That's what triggered it, OK? They should have not bombed and killed Abu [Waheeb]".

===== Takfir =====
According to traditional Islamic law, the blood of someone who leaves Islam is "forfeit"—i.e. they are condemned to death. This applies not only to self-proclaimed ex-Muslims, but to those who still believe themselves to be Muslims but who (in the eyes of their accusers) have deviated too far from orthodoxy. (Note: (The punishment is agreed on by all the schools of fiqh (Islamic jurisprudence) both Sunni and Shia, and has traditionally been undisputed.))

Many contemporary liberal/modernist/reformist Muslims believe killing appostates to be in violation of the Quranic injunction 'There is no compulsion in religion....' (Al-Baqara 256), but even earlier generations of Islamic scholars warned against making such accusations (known as takfir), without great care and usually reserved the punishment of death for "extreme, persistent and aggressive" proponents of religious innovation (bidʻah). The danger, according to some (such as Gilles Kepel), was that "used wrongly or unrestrainedly, ... Muslims might resort to mutually excommunicating one another and thus propel the Ummah to complete disaster."

Kepel noted that some of Qutb's early followers believed that his declaration that the Muslim world has reverted to pre-Islamic ignorance (Jahiliyyah), should be taken literally and everyone outside of their movement takfired; and Wahhabis has been known for their willingness to takfir non-Wahhabi Muslims.

Since the last half of the 20th century, a "central ideology" of insurgent Wahhabist/Salafi jihadist groups has been the "sanctioning" of "violence against leaders" of Muslim majority states who do not enforce sharia (Islamic law) or are otherwise "deemed insufficiently religious". Some insurgent groups - Al-Gama'a al-Islamiyya of Egypt, and later GIA, the Taliban, and ISIL) - are thought to have gone even further, applying takfir and its capital punishment against not only to Sunni government authorities and Shia Muslims, but to ordinary Sunni civilians who disagree with/disobeyed insurgent policies such as reinstituting slavery.

In 1977, the group Jama'at al-Muslimin (known to the public as Takfir wal-Hijra), kidnapped and later killed an Islamic scholar and former Egyptian government minister Muhammad al-Dhahabi. The founder of Jama'at al-Muslimin, Shukri Mustaf had been imprisoned with Sayyid Qutb, and had become one of Qutb's "most radical" disciples. He believed that not only was the Egyptian government apostate, but so was "Egyptian society as a whole" because it was "not fighting the Egyptian government and had thus accepted rule by non-Muslims". While police broke up the group, it reorganized with thousands of members, some of whom went on to help assassinate the Egyptian president Anwar Sadat, and join the Algerian Civil War and Al-Qaeda. During the 1990s, a violent Islamic insurgency in Egypt, primarily perpetrated by Al-Gama'a al-Islamiyya, targeted not only police and government officials but also civilians, killing or wounding 1106 persons in one particularly bloody year (1993).

In the brutal 1991–2002 Algerian Civil War, takfir of the general Algerian public was known to have been declared by the hardline Islamist Armed Islamic Group of Algeria (GIA). The GIA amir, Antar Zouabri claimed credit for two massacres of civilians (Rais and Bentalha massacres), calling the killings an "offering to God" and declaring impious the victims and all Algerians who had not joined its ranks. He declared that "except for those who are with us, all others are apostates and deserving of death," (Tens, and sometimes hundreds, of civilians were killed in each of a series of massacres that started in April 1998. However, how many murders were the doing of GIA and how many of the security forces—who had infiltrated the insurgents and were not known for their probity—is not known.)

In August 1998 the Taliban insurgents slaughtered 8000 mostly Shia Hazara non-combatants in Mazar-i-Sharif, Afghanistan. Comments by Mullah Niazi, the Taliban commander of the attack and newly installed governor, declared in a number of post-slaughter speeches from Mosques in Mazar-i-Sharif: "Hazaras are not Muslim, they are Shi'a. They are kofr [infidels]. The Hazaras killed our force here, and now we have to kill Hazaras. ... You either accept to be Muslims or leave Afghanistan. ...", indicated that along with revenge, and/or ethnic hatred, takfir was a motive for the slaughter.

From its inception in 2013 to 2020, directly or through affiliated groups, Daesh, "has been responsible for 27,947 terrorist deaths", the majority of these have been Muslims, (Note: according to Jamileh Kadivar based on estimates from Global Terrorism Database, 2020; Herrera, 2019; Human Rights Office of the High Commissioner for Human Rights & United Nations Assistance Mission for Iraq (UNAMI) Human Rights Office, 2014; Ibrahim, 2017; Obeidallah, 2014; 2015) "because it has regarded them as kafir".

One example of Daesh takfir is found in the 13th issue of its magazine Dabiq, which dedicated "dozens of pages ... to attacking and explaining the necessity of killing Shia", who the group refers to by the label Rafidah

Initiated by a sly Jew, [the Shia] are an apostate sect drowning in worship of the dead, cursing the best companions and wives of the Prophet, spreading doubt on the very basis of the religion (the Qur'ān and the Sunnah), defaming the very honor of the Prophet, and preferring their "twelve" imāms to the prophets and even to Allah! ...Thus, the Rāfidah are mushrik [polytheist] apostates who must be killed wherever they are to be found, until no Rāfidī walks on the face of earth, even if the jihād claimants despise such...

Daesh not only called for the revival of slavery of non-Muslims (specifically of the Yazidi minority group), but declared takfir on any Muslim who disagreed with their policy.

Yazidi women and children [are to be] divided according to the Shariah amongst the fighters of the Islamic State who participated in the Sinjar operations ... Enslaving the families of the kuffar and taking their women as concubines is a firmly established aspect of the Shariah that if one were to deny or mock, he would be denying or mocking the verses of the Koran and the narrations of the Prophet ... and thereby apostatizing from Islam.

Starting in 2013, Daesh began "encouraging takfir of Muslims deemed insufficiently pure in regard of tawhid (monotheism)". The Taliban were found "to be "a 'nationalist' movement, all too tolerant" of Shia. In 2015 ISIL "pronounced Jabhat al-Nusrat - then al-Qaida's affiliate in Syria - an apostate group."

===== Interpretations of the Qur'an and Hadith =====
Donald Holbrook, a Research Fellow at the Centre for the Study of Terrorism and Political Violence, analyzes a sample of 30 works by jihadist propagandists for references to Islamic scripture that justifies the objectives of violent jihad. An-Nisa (4:74–75) is quoted most frequently; other popular passages are At-Taubah (9:13–15, 38–39, 111), Al-Baqarah (2:190–191, 216), and Surah 9:5:

But when these months, prohibited (for fighting), are over, slay the idolaters wheresoever you find them, and take them captive or besiege them, and lie in wait for them at every likely place. But if they repent and fulfill their devotional obligations and pay the zakat, then let them go their way, for God is forgiving and kind.

Holbrook notes that the first part "slay the idolaters ..." is oft quoted but not the limiting factors at the end of the ayat.

==== Jihad and Islamic jurisprudence ====
Techniques of war are restricted by classical Islamic jurisprudence, but its scope is not. Bernard Lewis states that ultimately Jihad ends when the entire world is brought under Islamic rule and law. Classical Islamic jurisprudence imposes, without limit of time or space, the duty to subjugate non-Muslims, (according to Lewis). Wael Hallaq writes that some radical Islamists go beyond the classical theory to insist that the purpose of jihad is to overthrow regimes oppressing Muslims and bring non-Muslims to convert to Islam. In contrast, Islamic modernists–who Islamists despise–view jihad as defensive and compatible with modern standards of warfare. To justify their acts of religious violence, jihadist individuals and networks resort to the nonbinding genre of Islamic legal literature (fatwa) developed by jihadi-Salafist legal authorities, whose legal writings are shared and spread via the Internet.

Al-Qaeda

While Islamic opponents of attacks on civilians have quoted numerous prophetic hadith and hadith by Muhammad's first successor Abu Bakr, Al-Qaeda believes its attacks are religiously justified. After its first attack on a US target that killed civilians instead (a 1992 bombing of a hotel in Aden Yemen), Al Qaeda justified the killing of civilian bystanders through an interpretation (by one Abu Hajer) based on medieval jurist Ibn Taymiyyah (see above).

In a post-9/11 work, "A Statement from Qaidat al-Jihad Regarding the Mandates of the Heroes and the Legality of the Operations in New York and Washington", Al-Qaeda provided a more systematic justification—one that provided "ample theological justification for killing civilians in almost any imaginable situation." Among these justifications are that America is leading the countries of the West in waging war on Islam, which (al-Qaeda alleges) targets "Muslim women, children and elderly". This means any attacks on America are a defense of Islam, and any treaties and agreements between Muslim majority states and Western countries that would be violated by attacks are null and void. Other justifications for killing and situations where killings is allowed based on precedents in early Islamic history include: killing non-combatants when it is too difficult to distinguish between them and combatants when attacking an enemy "stronghold" (hist), and/or non-combatants remain in enemy territory; killing those who assist the enemy "in deed, word, mind", this includes civilians since they can vote in elections that bring enemies of Islam to power; necessity of killing in the war to protect Islam and Muslims; when the prophet was asked whether Muslim fighters could use the catapult against the village of Taif, even though the enemy fighters were mixed with a civilian population, he indicated in the affirmative; killing women, children and other protected groups is allowed when they serve as human shields for the enemy; killing of civilians is permitted if the enemy has broken a treaty.

Supporters of bin Laden have pointed to reports according to which the Islamic prophet Muhammad attacked towns at night or with catapults, and argued that he must have condoned incidental harm to noncombatants, since it would have been impossible to distinguish them from combatants during such attacks. These arguments were not widely accepted by Muslims.

Management of Savagery

Al-Qaeda's splinter groups and competitors, Jama'at al-Tawhid wal-Jihad and the Islamic State of Iraq and Syria, are thought to have been heavily influenced by a 2004 work on jihad entitled Management of Savagery (Idarat at-Tawahhush), written by Abu Bakr Naji and intended to provide a strategy to create a new Islamic caliphate by first destroying "vital economic and strategic targets" and terrifying the enemy with cruelty to break its will.

The tract asserts that "one who previously engaged in jihad knows that it is naught but violence, crudeness, terrorism, deterrence and massacring," and that even "the most abominable of the levels of savagery" of jihad are better "than stability under the order of unbelief"—those orders being any regime other than ISIL. Victims should not only be beheaded, shot, burn alive in cages or gradually submerged until drowned, but these events should be publicized with videos and photographs.

The Jurisprudence of Blood

The Houthi flag, with the top saying "God is the greatest", the next line saying "Death to America", followed by "Death to Israel", followed by "A curse upon the Jews", and the bottom saying "Victory to Islam".

Some observers have noted the evolution in the rules of jihad—from the original "classical" doctrine to that of 21st-century Salafi jihadism. According to the legal historian Sadarat Kadri, during the last couple of centuries, incremental changes in Islamic legal doctrine (developed by Islamists who otherwise condemn any bid'ah (innovation) in religion), have "normalized" what was once "unthinkable". "The very idea that Muslims might blow themselves up for God was unheard of before 1983, and it was not until the early 1990s that anyone anywhere had tried to justify killing innocent Muslims who were not on a battlefield."

The first or the "classical" doctrine of jihad which was developed towards the end of the 8th century, emphasized the "jihad of the sword" (jihad bil-saif) rather than the "jihad of the heart", but it contained many legal restrictions which were developed from interpretations of both the Quran and the Hadith, such as detailed rules involving "the initiation, the conduct, the termination" of jihad, the treatment of prisoners, the distribution of booty, etc. Unless there was a sudden attack on the Muslim community, jihad was not a "personal obligation" (fard 'ayn); instead it was a "collective one" (fard al-kifaya), which had to be discharged "in the way of God" (fi sabil Allah), and it could only be directed by the caliph, "whose discretion over its conduct was all but absolute." (This was designed in part to avoid incidents like the Kharijia's jihad against and killing of Caliph Ali, since they deemed that he was no longer a Muslim). Martyrdom resulting from an attack on the enemy with no concern for your own safety was praiseworthy, but dying by your own hand (as opposed to the enemy's) merited a special place in Hell. The category of jihad which is considered to be a collective obligation is sometimes simplified as "offensive jihad" in Western texts.

Based on the 20th-century interpretations of Sayyid Qutb, Abdullah Azzam, Ruhollah Khomeini, al-Qaeda and others, many if not all of those self-proclaimed jihad fighters believe that defensive global jihad is a personal obligation, which means that no caliph or Muslim head of state needs to declare it. Killing yourself in the process of killing the enemy is an act of martyrdom and it brings you a special place in Heaven, not a special place in Hell; and the killing of Muslim bystanders (nevermind Non-Muslims), should not impede acts of jihad. Military and intelligent analyst Sebastian Gorka described the new interpretation of jihad as the "willful targeting of civilians by a non-state actor through unconventional means."

Islamic theologian Abu Abdullah al-Muhajir has been identified as one of the key theorists and ideologues behind modern jihadist violence. His theological and legal justifications influenced Abu Musab al-Zarqawi, al-Qaeda member and former leader of al-Qaeda in Iraq, as well as several other jihadi terrorist groups, including ISIL and Boko Haram. Zarqawi used a 579-page manuscript of al-Muhajir's ideas at AQI training camps that were later deployed by ISIL, known in Arabic as Fiqh al-Dima and referred to in English as The Jurisprudence of Jihad or The Jurisprudence of Blood. The book has been described by counter-terrorism scholar Orwa Ajjoub as rationalizing and justifying "suicide operations, the mutilation of corpses, beheading, and the killing of children and non-combatants". The Guardian's journalist Mark Towsend, citing Salah al-Ansari of Quilliam, notes: "There is a startling lack of study and concern regarding this abhorrent and dangerous text [The Jurisprudence of Blood] in almost all Western and Arab scholarship". Charlie Winter of The Atlantic describes it as a "theological playbook used to justify the group's abhorrent acts". He states:

Ranging from ruminations on the merits of beheading, torturing, or burning prisoners to thoughts on assassination, siege warfare, and the use of biological weapons, Muhajir's intellectual legacy is a crucial component of the literary corpus of ISIS—and, indeed, whatever comes after it—a way to render practically anything permissible, provided, that is, it can be spun as beneficial to the jihad. [...] According to Muhajir, committing suicide to kill people is not only a theologically sound act, but a commendable one, too, something to be cherished and celebrated regardless of its outcome. [...] neither Zarqawi nor his inheritors have looked back, liberally using Muhajir's work to normalize the use of suicide tactics in the time since, such that they have become the single most important military and terrorist method—defensive or offensive—used by ISIS today. The way that Muhajir theorized it was simple—he offered up a theological fix that allows any who desire it to sidestep the Koranic injunctions against suicide.

Clinical psychologist Chris E. Stout also discusses the al Muhajir-inspired text in his essay, Terrorism, Political Violence, and Extremism (2017). He assesses that jihadists regard their actions as being "for the greater good"; that they are in a "weakened in the earth" situation that renders Islamic terrorism a valid means of solution.

=== Economic motivation ===
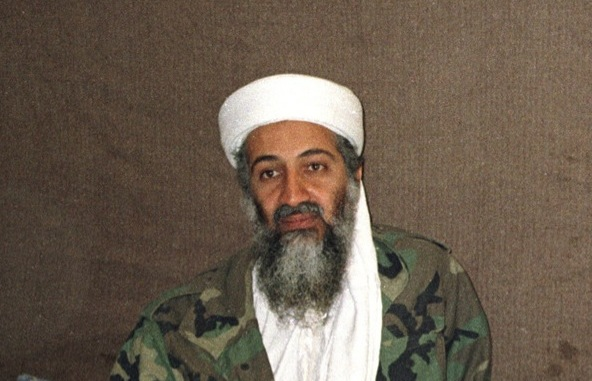
Osama Bin Laden, the founder of multinational terrorist group Al-Qaeda, in November 2001.

Following the 9/11 attack, commentators noted the poverty of Afghanistan, and speculated that blame might partly fall on a lack of a "higher priority to health, education, and economic development" funding by richer countries, and "stagnant economies and a paucity of jobs" in poorer countries.

Among the acts of oppression against Muslims by the United States and its allies alleged by the head of Al-Qaeda, are economic exploitation. In a 6 October 2002 message by Osama bin Laden 'Letter to America', he alleges

You steal our wealth and oil at paltry prices because of your international influence and military threats. This theft is indeed the biggest theft ever witnessed by mankind in the history of the world. ... If people steal our wealth, then we have the right to destroy their economy.

In a 1997 interview, he claimed that "since 1973, the price of petrol has increased only $8/barrel while the prices of other items have gone up three times. The oil prices should also have gone up three times but this did not happen", (Note: (This claim seems to be based on incorrect facts — the price of wheat did not increase three fold from 1973–1997 — and the questionable assumption that the demand and price for oil would continue to rise at a steady rate after the Arab Oil Embargo raised it by four fold in a short period.)) (On the other hand, in an interview five weeks after the destruction the World Trade Center towers his operation was responsible for, bin Laden described the towers as standing for—or "preaching"—not exploitation or capitalism, but "freedom human Rights, and equality".)

In 2002, academics Alan B. Krueger and Jitka Maleckova found "a careful review of the evidence provides little reason for optimism that a reduction in poverty or an increase in educational attainment would by themselves, meaningfully reduce international terrorism." Alberto Abadie found "the risk of terrorism is not significantly higher for poorer countries, once other country-specific characteristics are considered", but instead seems to correlate with a country's "level of political freedom".

Martin Kramer has argued that while terrorist organizers are seldom poor, their "foot-soldiers" often are. Andrew Whitehead states that "poverty creates opportunity" for terrorists, who have hired desperate poor children to do grunt work in Iraq and won the loyalty of poor in Lebanon by providing social services.

=== Western foreign policy ===
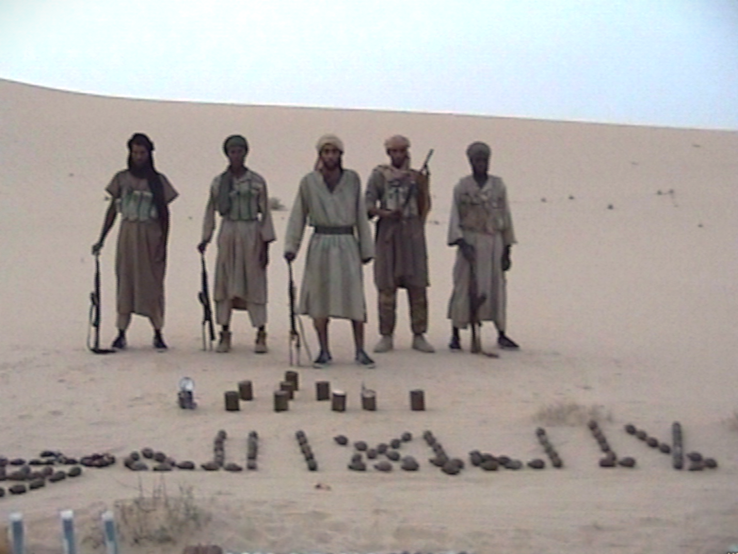
Al-Qaeda members pose with grenades and rifles, 2010

Many believe that groups like al-Qaeda and ISIS are reacting to aggression by non-Muslim (especially US) powers, and that religious beliefs are overstated if not irrelevant in their motivation. According to a graph by U.S. State Department, terrorist attacks escalated worldwide following the United States' 2001 invasion of Afghanistan and 2003 invasion of Iraq. Dame Eliza Manningham Buller, the former head of MI5, told the Iraq inquiry, the security services warned Tony Blair launching the war on terror would increase the threat of terrorism. Robert Pape has argued that at least terrorists utilizing suicide attacks—a particularly effective form of terrorist attack—are driven not by Islamism but by "a clear strategic objective: to compel modern democracies to withdraw military forces from the territory that the terrorists view as their homeland". However, Martin Kramer, who debated Pape on origins of suicide bombing, stated that the motivation for suicide attacks is not just strategic logic but also an interpretation of Islam to provide a moral logic. For example, Hezbollah initiated suicide bombings after a complex reworking of the concept of martyrdom. Kramer explains that the Israeli occupation of the South Lebanon Security Zone raised the temperature necessary for this reinterpretation of Islam, but occupation alone would not have been sufficient for suicide terrorism. "The only way to apply a brake to suicide terrorism," Kramer argues, "is to undermine its moral logic, by encouraging Muslims to see its incompatibility with their own values."

Breaking down the content of Osama bin Laden's statements and interviews collected in Bruce Lawrence's Messages to the World (Lawrence shares Payne's belief in US imperialism and aggression as the cause of Islamic terrorism), James L. Payne found that 72% of the content was on the theme of "criticism of U.S./Western/Jewish aggression, oppression, and exploitation of Muslim lands and peoples" while only 1% of bin Laden's statements focused on criticizing "American society and culture".

Former CIA analyst Michael Scheuer argues that terrorist attacks (specifically al-Qaeda attacks on targets in the United States) are not motivated by a religiously inspired hatred of American culture or religion, but by the belief that U.S. foreign policy has oppressed, killed, or otherwise harmed Muslims in the Middle East, condensed in the phrase "They hate us for what we do, not who we are." U.S. foreign policy actions Scheuer believes are fueling Islamic terror include: the US–led intervention in Afghanistan and invasion of Iraq; Israel–United States relations, namely, financial, military, and political support for Israel; U.S. support for "apostate" police states in Muslim nations such as Egypt, Algeria, Morocco, and Kuwait; U.S. support for the creation of an independent East Timor from territory previously held by Muslim Indonesia; perceived U.S. approval or support of actions against Muslim insurgents in India, the Philippines, Chechnya, and Palestine.

Maajid Nawaz and Sam Harris argue that in many cases there is simply no connection between acts of Islamic extremism and Western intervention in Muslim lands.

Nawaz: ... What does killing the Yazidi population on Mount Sinjar have to do with US foreign policy? What does enforcing headscarves (tents in fact) on women in Waziristan and Afghanistan, and lashing them, forcing men to grow beards under threat of a whip, chopping off hands, and so forth, have to do with US foreign policy?
Harris: This catalogue of irrelevancy could be extended indefinitely. What does the Sunni bombing of Shia and Ahmadi mosques in Pakistan have to with Israel or US foreign policy?

Nawaz also argues that suicide bombers in non-Muslim majority countries such as the 7 July 2005 bombers can be said to motivated by ideology not by any desire to compel UK military to withdraw from "their homeland", as they were born and raised in Yorkshire. They had never set foot in Iraq and do not speak its language.

=== Socio-psychological motivations ===
==== Socio-psychological development ====
A motivator of violent radicalism (not just found in Al-Qaeda and ISIS) is psychological development during adolescence. Cally O'Brien found many terrorists were "not exposed to the West in a positive context, whether by simple isolation or conservative family influence, until well after they had established a personal and social identity." Looking at theories of psychological personal identity Seth Schwartz, Curitis Dunkel and Alan Waterman found two types of "personal identities" susceptible to radicalization leading to terrorism:

1. "Foreclosed and authoritarian" — Principally conservative Muslims who are often taught by their family and communities from early childhood to not deviate from a strict path and to either consider inferior or hate outside groups. When exposed to (alien) western culture, they are likely to judge it relative to their perception of the correct order of society, as well as perceive their own identities and mental health to be at risk.
2. "Diffuse and aimless" — Principally converts whose lives are characterized by "aimlessness, uncertainty and indecisiveness" and who have neither explored different identities nor committed to a personal identity. Such people are "willing to go to their deaths for ideas [such as jihadism] that they have appropriated from others" and that give their lives purpose and certainty.

=== Characteristics of terrorists ===
In 2004, a forensic psychiatrist and former foreign service officer, Marc Sageman, made an "intensive study of biographical data on 172 participants in the jihad" in his book Understanding Terror Networks. He concluded social networks, the "tight bonds of family and friendship", rather than emotional and behavioral disorders of "poverty, trauma, madness, [or] ignorance", inspired alienated young Muslims to join the jihad and kill.

According to anthropologist Scott Atran, a NATO researcher studying suicide terrorism, as of 2005, the available evidence contradicts a number of simplistic explanations for the motivations of terrorists, including mental instability, poverty, and feelings of humiliation. The greatest predictors of suicide bombings—one common type of terror tactic used by Islamic terrorists—turns out to be not religion but group dynamics. While personal humiliation does not turn out to be a motivation for those attempting to kill civilians, the perception that others with whom one feels a common bond are being humiliated can be a powerful driver for action. "Small-group dynamics involving friends and family that form the diaspora cell of brotherhood and camaraderie on which the rising tide of martyrdom actions is based". Terrorists, according to Atran, are social beings influenced by social connections and values. Rather than dying "for a cause", they might be said to have died "for each other".

In a 2011 doctoral thesis, anthropologist Kyle R. Gibson reviewed three studies documenting 1,208 suicide attacks from 1981 to 2007 and found that countries with higher polygyny rates correlated with greater production of suicide terrorists. Political scientist Robert Pape has found that among Islamic suicide terrorists, 97 percent were unmarried and 84 percent were male (or if excluding the Kurdistan Workers' Party, 91 percent male), while a study conducted by the U.S. military in Iraq in 2008 found that suicide bombers were almost always single men without children aged 18 to 30 (with a mean age of 22), and were typically students or employed in blue-collar occupations. In addition to noting that countries where polygyny is widely practiced tend to have higher homicide rates and rates of rape, political scientists Valerie M. Hudson and Bradley Thayer have argued that because Islam is the only major religious tradition where polygyny is still largely condoned, the higher degrees of marital inequality in Islamic countries than most of the world causes them to have larger populations susceptible to suicide terrorism, and that promises of harems of virgins for martyrdom serves as a mechanism to mitigate in-group conflict within Islamic countries between alpha and non-alpha males by bringing esteem to the latter's families and redirecting their violence towards out-groups.

Along with his research on the Tamil Tigers, Scott Atran found that Palestinian terrorist groups (such as Hamas) provide monthly stipends, lump-sum payments, and massive prestige to the families of suicide terrorists. Citing Atran and other anthropological research showing that 99 percent of Palestinian suicide terrorists are male, that 86 percent are unmarried, and that 81 percent have at least six siblings (larger than the average Palestinian family size), cognitive scientist Steven Pinker argues in The Better Angels of Our Nature (2011) that because the families of men in the West Bank and Gaza often cannot afford bride prices and that many potential brides end up in polygynous marriages, the financial compensation of an act of suicide terrorism can buy enough brides for a man's brothers to have children to make the self-sacrifice pay off in terms of kin selection and biological fitness (with Pinker also citing a famous quotation attributed to evolutionary biologist J. B. S. Haldane when Haldane quipped that he would not sacrifice his life for his brother but would for "two brothers or eight cousins").

In 2007, scholar Olivier Roy described the background of the hundreds of global (as opposed to local) terrorists who were incarcerated or killed and for whom authorities have records, as being surprising in a number of ways: The subjects frequently had a Westernized background; there were few Palestinians, Iraqis, or Afghans "coming to avenge what is going on in their country"; there was a lack of religiosity before radicalization through being "born again" in a foreign country; a high percentage of subjects had converted to Islam; their backgrounds were "de-territorialized "—meaning, for example, they were "born in a country, then educated in another country, then go to fight in a third country and take refuge in a fourth country"; and their beliefs about jihad differed from traditional ones—i.e. they believed jihad to be permanent, global, and "not linked with a specific territory." Roy believes terrorism/radicalism is "expressed in religious terms" among the terrorists studied because

1. most of the radicals have a Muslim background, which makes them open to a process of re-Islamisation ("almost none of them having been pious before entering the process of radicalisation"), and
2. jihad is "the only cause on the global market". If you kill in silence, it will be reported by the local newspaper; "if you kill yelling 'Allahu Akbar', you are sure to make the national headlines". Other extreme causes—ultra-left or radical ecology are "too bourgeois and intellectual" for the radicals.

Author Lawrence Wright described the characteristic of "displacement" of members of the most famous Islamic terrorist group, al-Qaeda:

What the recruits tended to have in common—besides their urbanity, their cosmopolitan backgrounds, their education, their facility with languages, and their computer skills—was displacement. Most who joined the jihad did so in a country other than the one in which they were reared. They were Algerians living in expatriate enclaves in France, Moroccans in Spain, or Yemenis in Saudi Arabia. Despite their accomplishments, they had little standing in the host societies where they lived.

This profile of global Jihadists differs from that found among more recent local Islamist suicide bombers in Afghanistan. According to a 2007 study of 110 suicide bombers by Afghan pathologist Dr. Yusef Yadgari, 80% of the attackers studied had some kind of physical or mental disability. The bombers were also "not celebrated like their counterparts in other Muslim nations. Afghan bombers are not featured on posters or in videos as martyrs." Daniel Byman, a Middle East expert at the Brookings Institution, and Christine Fair, an assistant professor in peace and security studies at Georgetown University, argue that many of the Islamic terrorists are foolish and untrained, perhaps even untrainable, with one in two Taliban suicide bombers killing only themselves.

Studying 300 cases of people charged with jihadist terrorism in the United States since 11 September 2001, author Peter Bergen found the perpetrators were "generally motivated by a mix of factors", including "militant Islamist ideology;" opposition to "American foreign policy in the Muslim world; a need to attach themselves to an ideology or organization that gave them a sense of purpose"; and a "cognitive opening" to militant Islam that often was "precipitated by personal disappointment, like the death of a parent".

However, two studies of the background of Muslim terrorists in Europe—one of the UK and one of France—found little connection between religious piety and terrorism among the terrorist rank and file. A "restricted" report of hundreds of case studies by the UK domestic counter-intelligence agency MI5 found that

[f]ar from being religious zealots, a large number of those involved in terrorism do not practise their faith regularly. Many lack religious literacy and could actually be regarded as religious novices. Very few have been brought up in strongly religious households, and there is a higher than average proportion of converts. Some are involved in drug-taking, drinking alcohol and visiting prostitutes. MI5 says there is evidence that a well-established religious identity actually protects against violent radicalisation.

A 2015 "general portrait" of "the conditions and circumstances" under which people living in France become "Islamic radicals" (terrorists or would-be terrorists) by Olivier Roy (see above) found radicalisation was not an "uprising of a Muslim community that is victim to poverty and racism: only young people join, including converts".

== Refutations, criticisms and explanations for decline ==
=== Refuting Islamic terrorism ===
Along with explaining Islamic terrorism, many observers have attempted to point out their inconsistencies and the flaws in their arguments, often suggesting means of de-motivating potential terrorists.

Princeton University Middle Eastern scholar Bernard Lewis argues that although bin Laden and other radical Islamists claim they are fighting to restore shariah law to the Muslim world, their attacks on civilians violate the classical form of that Islamic jurisprudence. The "classical jurists of Islam never remotely considered [jihad] the kind of unprovoked, unannounced mass slaughter of uninvolved civil populations". In regard to the September 11 attacks Lewis noted,

Being a religious obligation, jihad is elaborately regulated in sharia law, which discusses in minute detail such matters as the opening, conduct, interruption and cessation of hostilities, the treatment of prisoners and noncombatants, the use of weapons, etc. Similarly, the laws of Jihad categorically preclude wanton and indiscriminate slaughter. The warriors in the holy war are urged not to harm non-combatants, women and children, "unless they attack you first". ... A point on which they insist is the need for a clear declaration of war before beginning hostilities, and for proper warning before resuming hostilities after a truce. What the classical jurists of Islam never remotely considered is the kind of unprovoked, unannounced mass slaughter of uninvolved civil populations that we saw in New York two weeks ago. For this there is no precedent and no authority in Islam.

Similarly, Timothy Winter writes that the proclamations of bin Laden and Ayman al-Zawahiri "ignore 14 centuries of Muslim scholarship", and that if they "followed the norms of their religion, they would have had to acknowledge that no school of mainstream Islam allows the targeting of civilians."

Researcher Donald Holbrook notes that while many jihadists quote the beginning of the famous sword verse (or ayah):

- But when these months, prohibited (for fighting), are over, slay the idolaters wheresoever you find them, and take them captive or besiege them, and lie in wait for them at every likely place. ...

... they fail to quote and discuss limiting factors that follow,

- ".... But if they repent and fulfill their devotional obligations and pay the zakat, then let them go their way, for God is forgiving and kind."

showing how they are (Holbrook argues) "shamelessly selective in order to serve their propaganda objectives."

The scholarly credentials of the ideologues of extremism are also "questionable". Dale C. Eikmeier notes

With the exception of Abul Ala Maududi and Abdullah Yusuf Azzam, none of Qutbism's main theoreticians trained at Islam's recognized centers of learning. Although a devout Muslim, Hassan al-Banna was a teacher and community activist. Sayyid Qutb was a literary critic. Mohammed Abdul-Salam Farag was an electrician. Ayman al-Zawahiri is a physician. Osama bin Laden trained to be a businessman.

Michael Sells and Jane I. Smith (a professor of Islamic Studies) write that barring some extremists like al-Qaeda, most Muslims do not interpret Qur'anic verses as promoting warfare today but rather as reflecting historical contexts. According to Sells, most Muslims "no more expect to apply" the verses at issue "to their contemporary non-Muslim friends and neighbors than most Christians and Jews consider themselves commanded by God, like the Biblical Joshua, to exterminate the infidels."

In his book No god but God: The Origins, Evolution, and Future of Islam, Iranian-American academic Reza Aslan argues that there is an internal battle currently taking place within Islam between individualistic reform ideals and the traditional authority of Muslim clerics. The struggle is similar to that of the 16th-century reformation in Christianity, and in fact is happening when the religion of Islam is as "old" as Christianity was at the time of its reformation. Aslan argues that "the notion that historical context should play no role in the interpretation of the Koran—that what applied to Muhammad's community applies to all Muslim communities for all time—is simply an untenable position in every sense."

Despite their proclaimed devotion to the virtue of Sharia law, Jihadists have not always avoided association with the pornography of the despised West. The Times (London) newspaper has pointed out that Jihadists were discovered by one source to have sought anonymity through some of the same dark networks used to distribute child pornography—quite ironic given their proclaimed piety. Similarly, Reuters news agency reported that pornography was found among the materials seized from Osama bin Laden's Abbottabad compound that was raided by U.S. Navy SEALs.

Takfir

Despite the fact that a founding principle of modern violent jihad is the defense of Islam and Muslims, most victims of attacks by Islamic terrorism ("the vast majority" according to one source—J.J. Goldberg) are self-proclaimed Muslims. Many if not all Salafi-Jihadi groups practice takfir—i.e. proclaim that some self-proclaimed Muslims (especially government officials and security personnel) are actually apostates deserving of death.

Furthermore, the more learned salafi-jihadi thinkers and leaders are (and were), the more reluctance they are/were to embrace takfir (according to a study by Shane Drennan). The late Abdullah Yusuf Azzam, "the godfather of the Afghan jihad", for example, was an Islamic scholar and university professor who avoided takfir and preached unity in the ummah (Muslim community). The Islamic education of Al-Qaeda's number two leader, Ayman al-Zawahiri, was early and much more informal—he was not a trained scholar—and al-Zawahiri expanded the definition of kafir to include many self-proclaimed Muslims. He has maintained that civilian government employees of Muslim states, security forces and any persons collaborating or engaging with these groups are apostates, for example.

Two extreme takfiris -- Abu Musab al-Zarqawi, a Sunni jihadist leader in Iraq, and Djamel Zitouni, leader of the Algerian Armed Islamic Group of Algeria (GIA) during the Algerian civil war—had even broader definitions of apostasy and less religious knowledge. Al-Zarqawi was a petty criminal who had no religious training until he was 22 and limited training thereafter. Famous for bombing targets other jihadis thought off limits, his definition of apostates included all Shia Muslims and "anyone violating his organization's interpretation of Shari'a". Djamel Zitouni was the son of a chicken farmer with little Islamic education. He famously expanded the GIA's definition of apostate until he concluded the whole of Algerian society outside of the GIA "had left Islam". His attacks led to the deaths of thousands of Algerian civilians.

=== Deradicalization ===
Egypts's largest radical Islamic group, al-Jama'a al-Islamiyya — which killed at least 796 Egyptian policemen and soldiers from 1992 to 1998 — renounced bloodshed in 2003 in a deal with the Egyptian government where a series of high-ranking members were released (as of 2009 "the group has perpetrated no new terrorist acts"). A second group Egyptian Islamic Jihad made a similar agreement in 2007. Preceding the agreements was program where Muslim scholars debated with imprisoned group leaders arguing that true Islam did not support terrorism.

== Muslim attitudes toward terrorism ==
The opinions of Muslims on the subject of attacks on civilians by Islamist groups vary. Fred Halliday, an Irish academic specialist on the Middle East, argues that most Muslims consider these acts to be egregious violations of Islam's laws. Muslims living in the West denounce the 11 September attacks against United States, while Hezbollah contends that their rocket attacks against Israeli targets are defensive jihad by a legitimate resistance movement rather than terrorism.

=== Views of modern Islamic scholars ===
In reference to suicide attacks, Hannah Stuart notes there is a "significant debate among contemporary clerics over which circumstance permit such attacks." Qatar-based theologian, Yusuf al-Qaradawi, criticized the 9/11 attacks but previously justified suicide bombings in Israel on the grounds of necessity and justified such attacks in 2004 against American military and civilian personnel in Iraq. According to Stuart, 61 contemporary Islamic leaders have issued fatawa permitting suicide attacks, 32 with respect to Israel. Stuart points out that all of these contemporary rulings are contrary to classical Islamic jurisprudence.

Charles Kurzman and other authors have collected statements by prominent Muslim figures and organizations condemning terrorism. In September 2014, an open letter to ISIS by "over 120 prominent Muslim scholars" denounced that group for "numerous religious transgressions and abominable crimes".

Huston Smith, an author on comparative religion, argued that extremists have hijacked Islam, just as has occurred periodically in Christianity, Hinduism and other religions throughout history. He added that the real problem is that extremists do not know their own faith.

Ali Gomaa, former Grand Mufti of Egypt, stated not only for Islam but in general: "Terrorism cannot be born of religion. Terrorism is the product of corrupt minds, hardened hearts, and arrogant egos, and corruption, destruction, and arrogance are unknown to the heart attached to the divine."

A 600-page legal opinion (fatwa) by Muhammad Tahir-ul-Qadri condemned suicide bombings and other forms of terrorism as kufr (unbelief), stating that it "has no place in Islamic teaching and no justification can be provided for it, or any kind of excuses or ifs or buts." Iranian Ayatollah Ozma Seyyed Yousef Sanei has preached against suicide attacks and stated in an interview: "Terror in Islam, and especially Shiite, is forbidden."

A group of Pakistani clerics of Jamaat Ahl-e-Sunnah (Barelvi movement) who were gathered for a convention denounced suicide attacks and beheadings as un-Islamic in a unanimous resolution. On 2 July 2013 in Lahore, 50 Muslim scholars of the Sunni Ittehad Council (SIC) issued a collective fatwa against suicide bombings, the killing of innocent people, bomb attacks, and targeted killings. It considers them to be forbidden.

== Tactics ==
=== Suicide attacks ===
Hezbollah was the first group to use suicide bombers in the Middle East. An increasingly popular tactic used by terrorists is suicide bombing. This tactic is used against civilians, soldiers, and government officials of the regimes the terrorists oppose. A recent clerical ruling declares terrorism and suicide bombing as forbidden by Islam.

=== Hijackings ===
Islamic terrorism sometimes employs the hijacking of passenger vehicles. The most infamous were the "9/11" attacks that killed nearly 3,000 people on a single day in 2001, effectively ending the era of aircraft hijacking.

=== Hostage taking, kidnappings and executions ===
Along with bombings and hijackings, Islamic terrorists have made extensive use of highly publicised kidnappings and executions (i.e. ritualized murders), often circulating videos of the acts for use as propaganda. A frequent form of execution by these groups is decapitation, another is shooting. In the 1980s, a series of abductions of American citizens by Hezbollah during the Lebanese Civil War resulted in the 1986 Iran–Contra affair. During the chaos of the Iraq War, more than 200 kidnappings foreign hostages (for various reasons and by various groups, including purely criminal) gained great international notoriety, even as the great majority (thousands) of victims were Iraqis. In 2007, the kidnapping of Alan Johnston by Army of Islam resulted in the British government meeting a Hamas member for the first time.

Motivations

Islamist militants, including Boko Haram, Hamas, al-Qaeda and the ISIS, have used kidnapping as a method of fundraising, as a means of bargaining for political concessions, and as a way of intimidating potential opponents.

==== As political tactic ====
An example of political kidnapping occurred in September 2014, in the Philippines. The German Foreign Ministry reported that the Islamist militant group Abu Sayyaf had kidnapped two German nationals and was threatening to kill them unless the German government withdraw its support for the war against ISIS and also pay a large ransom. In September 2014 an Islamist militant group kidnapped a French national in Algeria and threatened to kill the hostage unless the government of France withdrew its support for the war against ISIS.

===== Islamist self-justifications =====
ISIL justified various acts internally, including beheadings and its kidnapping of Yazidi women and forcing them to become sex slaves or concubines.

Abubakar Shekau, the leader of the Nigerian extremist group Boko Haram, said in a 2014 interview claiming responsibility for the 2014 Chibok kidnapping of 270+ schoolgirls, "Slavery is allowed in my religion, and I shall capture people and make them slaves".

==== Kidnapping as revenue ====
Nasir al-Wuhayshi leader of the Islamist militant group Al-Qaida in the Arabian Peninsula describes kidnapped hostages as "an easy spoil... which I may describe as a profitable trade and a precious treasure."

A 2014 investigation, by journalist Rukmini Maria Callimachi published in The New York Times demonstrated that between 2008 and 2014, Al Qaeda and groups directly affiliated with al-Qaeda took in over US$125 million from kidnapping, with $66 million of that total paid in 2013 alone. The article showed that from a somewhat haphazard beginning in 2003, kidnapping grew into the group's main fundraising strategy, with targeted, professional kidnapping of civilians from wealthy European countries—principally France, Spain and Switzerland—willing to pay huge ransoms. US and UK nationals are less commonly targeted since these governments have shown an unwillingness to pay ransom.

Boko Haram kidnapped Europeans for the Ransom their governments would pay in the early 2010s.

According to Yochi Dreazen writing in Foreign Policy, although ISIS received funding from Qatar, Kuwait and other Gulf oil states, "traditional criminal techniques like kidnapping", are a key funding source for ISIS. Armin Rosen writing in Business Insider, kidnapping was a "crucial early source" of funds as ISIS expanded rapidly in 2013. In March, upon receiving payment from the government of Spain, ISIS released 2 Spanish hostages working for the newspaper El Mundo, correspondent Javier Espinosa and photographer Ricardo Garcia Vilanova, who had been held since September 2013. Philip Balboni, CEO of GlobalPost told the press that he had spent "millions" in efforts to ransom journalist James Foley, and an American official told the Associated Press that demand from ISIS was for 100 million ($132.5). In September 2014, following the release of ISIS Beheading videos of journalists James Foley and Steven Sotloff, British Prime Minister David Cameron appealed to members of the G7 to abide by their pledges not to pay ransom "in the case of terrorist kidnap".

Holding foreign journalists as hostages is so valuable to ISIS that Rami Jarrah, a Syrian who has acted as go-between in efforts to ransom foreign hostages, told the Wall Street Journal that ISIS had "made it known" to other militant groups that they "would pay" for kidnapped journalists. ISIS has also kidnapped foreign-aid workers and Syrians who work for foreign-funded groups and reconstruction projects in Syria. By mid-2014, ISIS was holding assets valued at US$2 billion.

===== Kidnapping as psychological warfare =====
Boko Haram has been described as using kidnapping as a means of intimidating the civilian population into non-resistance.

According to psychologist Irwin Mansdorf, Hamas demonstrated effectiveness of kidnapping as a form of psychological warfare in the 2006 capture of the Israeli soldier Gilad Shalit when public pressure forced the government of Israel to release 1027 prisoners, including 280 convicted of terrorism by Israel, in exchange for his release. According to The New York Times, "Hamas has recognized the pull such incidents have over the Israeli psyche and clearly has moved to grab hostages in incidents such as the death and ransoming of Oron Shaul."

=== Internet recruiting ===
In the beginning of the 21st century, emerged a worldwide network of hundreds of web sites that inspire, train, educate and recruit young Muslims to engage in jihad against the United States and other Western countries, taking less prominent roles in mosques and community centers that are under scrutiny.

== Examples of organizations ==
The "black flag of Jihad", used by various Islamist organizations since the late 1990s, consists of a white-on-black shahada.

=== Africa ===
The African continent has been affected by significant Islamist terrorist activity across the continent, involving various militant groups responsible for widespread violence and instability. In East Africa, Al-Shabaab has been a central figure in conflicts, particularly in Somalia and Kenya. North and West Africa have seen major incidents tied to groups like Boko Haram, which has caused severe disruptions in Nigeria and neighboring countries. Additionally, nations such as Egypt, Algeria, Tunisia, and Morocco have experienced deadly attacks linked to broader extremist networks. These activities have led to extensive casualties and displacement across the region. Civilians have been the main targets of terrorist attacks by Islamist militants.

=== Asia ===
In Afghanistan, Taliban and Hezb-e-Islami Gulbuddin forces have attacked civilians. Kyrgyz-American brothers were behind the Boston Marathon bombing. In Tajikistan, the IMU was blamed for a 2010 suicide bombing that killed two policemen. Uzbekistan saw multiple attacks, including the 1999 Tashkent bombings targeting President Karimov. China has faced attacks linked to Xinjiang separatism. In Bangladesh, Jamaat-ul-Mujahideen and Ansarullah Bangla have been involved in bombings and attacks on activists. In India, Lashkar-e-Taiba and Jaish-e-Mohammed are responsible for numerous attacks, while Pakistan and Sri Lanka have also faced Islamist attacks. The Abu Sayyaf Group in the Philippines continued a long-running insurgency until 2024.

=== Europe ===
Planned and foiled Jihadist terror attacks in Europe. Journal of Peace Research, revised figures.
View chart definition.

The Europe has seen significant Islamist terrorist attacks, including the 2004 Madrid bombings, the 2005 London bombings, and the 2015 Paris attacks, all of which caused numerous casualties. A report highlights that jihadist terrorism has been responsible for the majority of deaths from terrorism in Europe from 2001 to 2014. It also discusses how jihadists in Europe have financed their activities through petty crime and how terrorist attacks have increasingly targeted people rather than property. Countries like Belgium, Netherlands, France, and Germany have faced multiple attacks, with Belgium being a significant base for planning attacks like the 2015 Paris attacks. Despite proximity to conflict zones, Italy has had relatively fewer jihadist incidents. The EU report found that most Islamist terror suspects were second or third-generation immigrants, while over 99% of attempted terrorist attacks in Europe in the past three years were committed by non-Muslims.

In Norway, two men were sentenced in 2012 under anti-terror legislation for plotting against cartoonist Kurt Westergaard. Russia has faced politically and religiously motivated attacks, particularly in Chechnya, including the 2002 Moscow theater and 2004 Beslan school hostage crises, linked to groups like the Caucasus Emirate. Spain has seen jihadist activity since the 1990s, highlighted by the 2004 Madrid train bombings and the 2017 Barcelona attacks. In Sweden, terrorist incidents have occurred like the 2010 Stockholm bombings and the 2017 Stockholm truck attack.

=== Middle East ===
Militant Islamism in Turkey primarily has Kurdish roots, with groups like Turkish Hizbullah and İBDA-C opposing Turkish secularism. Iraq has experienced terrorist activity, especially during the US-led Iraq War. In Palestine and Israeli territories, groups such as Hamas and the Islamic Jihad Movement have launched numerous attacks against Israel. Additionally, Fatah al-Islam operates in Lebanon with goals of establishing Islamic law in Palestinian refugee camps.

=== Americas ===
In Canada, the government identifies terrorism as a significant threat, particularly emphasizing domestic radicalization, as seen in the 2006 Ontario terrorism plot involving an Al-Qaeda-inspired cell. In the United States, the 9/11 attacks resulted in nearly 3,000 fatalities and initiated the war on terror, with homegrown extremism highlighted as a major concern. Australia and New Zealand have also experienced notable attacks, such as the Lindt Café siege and the Auckland supermarket stabbing. In Argentina, the 1992 bombing of the Israeli embassy and the 1994 AMIA bombing were linked to terrorist groups and Iran, resulting in significant casualties and political repercussions.

=== Transnational ===
Al-Qaeda's stated aim is the use of jihad to defend and protect Islam against Zionism, Christianity, the secular West, and Muslim governments such as Saudi Arabia, which it sees as insufficiently Islamic and too closely tied to the United States.

== See also ==
- Christian terrorism
- Domestic terrorism
- History of terrorism
- Islamic extremism
- Islamism
- Jewish terrorism
- Jihadism
- List of Islamist terrorist attacks
- Hindu terrorism

== Bibliography ==
- Kepel, Gilles (2002). Jihad: The Trail of Political Islam. Harvard University Press. ISBN 978-0-674-01090-1.
- Bin Laden, Osama; Lawrence, Bruce (2005). Messages to the world: the statements of Osama Bin Laden. Verso. ISBN 978-1-84467-045-1.
- Cooper, William Wager; Yue, Piyu (2008). Challenges of the muslim world: present, future and past. Emerald Group Publishing. ISBN 978-0-444-53243-5.
- Dreyfuss, Robert (2006). Devil's Game: How the United States Helped Unleash Fundamentalist Islam. Macmillan. ISBN 978-0-8050-8137-4.
- Sageman, Marc (2004). Understanding terror networks. University of Pennsylvania Press. ISBN 978-0-8122-3808-2.
- Scheuer, Michael; Anonymous (2004). Imperial Hubris: Why the West Is Losing the War on Terror. Dulles, Virginia: Potomac Books (formerly Brassey's, Inc.). ISBN 978-0-9655139-4-4.
