= Hunting Evil =

Book by Guy Walters

- Cover of the first edition
- Author: Guy Walters
- Language: English
- Subject: Nazi war criminals
- Publisher: Bantam (United Kingdom); Random House (United States)
- Publication date: 2009
- Publication place: United Kingdom
- Media type: Print (Hardcover and Paperback)
- Pages: 528
- ISBN: 978-0-7679-2873-1

Hunting Evil: The Nazi War Criminals Who Escaped and the Quest to Bring Them to Justice is a 2009 book by English historian Guy Walters. It is the first complete and definitive account of how the most notorious Nazi war criminals escaped justice at the end of World War II and managed to live normal lives as fugitives all the while many of their peers were pursued and captured. The book is based on new interviews with an array of individuals including Nazi hunters as well as former Nazis and intelligence agents. It traces back the actual escape routes, based on archival documents in Germany, Britain, the United States, Austria, and Italy. It also debunks much of the legend of the ODESSA network in the postwar era.

== Summary ==
The book details the German Nazis who were put on trial as well as selected others that were not. After World War II, the hunt was on for runaway Nazis with varied results. It is commonly believed that the operations ODESSA and Spider existed to help them escape, but no such network existed according to the book, even though many others did including Konsul, Scharnhorst, Sechsgestirn, Leibwache and Lustige Brüder. The Jewish Chronicle reported on the author's belief that Simon Wiesenthal has contradictory claims.
