= José Manuel López =

José Manuel López may refer to:

- José Manuel López Rodríguez, Spanish cyclist
- José Manuel López Gaspar, Spanish footballer
- José Manuel López Rodrigo, Spanish activist and politician
- José Manuel López Castro, vocalist and lead guitarist of Los Plebes del Rancho de Ariel Camacho
- José Manuel López (footballer), Argentine footballer
- Josesito López (José Manuel López), American boxer
- José Manuel López, Spanish journalist, see Disappearance of Antonio Pampliega, José Manuel López and Ángel Sastre
