= James Owen (British author) =

British historian and journalist

James Owen (born 1969) is a British historian and journalist.

== Biography ==
Owen was born in Holland Park, London, and was educated at Eton College and University College, Oxford. After a brief period as a barrister, he worked at The Daily Telegraph as a journalist from 1995 until 2001. In 2004, with Guy Walters, he edited The Voice of War, an anthology of World War II memoirs, diaries and letters.

In 2005, he published A Serpent in Eden, an investigation of the unsolved murder in The Bahamas in 1943 of Sir Harry Oakes. Shortlisted for the Crime Writers' Association Gold Dagger for Non-Fiction, this was filmed as a drama documentary, entitled Murder in Paradise, for the UK's Channel 4 and broadcast in December 2006. That year, Owen also published Nuremberg: Evil On Trial, a re-examination on its 60th anniversary of the case conducted against the leading Nazis after the Second World War.

Danger UXB tells the story of the early days of Bomb Disposal during the Battle of Britain and The Blitz through the experiences of many of those involved, including Bertram Stuart Trevelyan Archer and Charles Howard, 20th Earl of Suffolk.

His most recent work, published in 2012, is Commando, a history of the raiding force and its operations during the Second World War.

Many of Owen's books seek to overturn long-held ideas and conventional wisdom. A Serpent in Eden rebuts the theory advanced by other writers that the Duke of Windsor attempted to influence the outcome of the investigation into the murder of Sir Harry Oakes. Of Nuremberg: Evil On Trial, Marcel Berlins wrote that Owen had shown that it was not the fair and just trial usually claimed, while in Danger UXB Owen cast doubt on the supposed circumstances surrounding the saving of St Paul's Cathedral by Robert Davies (GC) and the subsequent award to him of the first George Cross.

In Commando, Owen argues that the popular perception of the force has been shaped more by post-war films and literature than by their actual wartime role, which was less as small bands of raiders than as large formations of assault troops. He also points out that the Commandos in fact carried out few operations in their first two years as a unit, and that the excessive publicity these received led to much resentment of them by the rest of the Army.

He is the editor of Great Letters, a selection of notable, witty and quirky correspondence to The Times during the past century, and co-editor with Samantha Wyndham of Great War Letters, an anthology of letters published in the newspaper during the First World War.

Owen also works as a journalist and critic and is a former trustee of the London Library. He was a teaching Fellow of the Royal Literary Fund at the London School of Economics (LSE) from 2012 until 2014 and at University College London (UCL) in 2014-2015.

== Bibliography ==
- The Voice of War, with Guy Walters, Viking, 2004 ISBN 0-670-91423-1
- A Serpent in Eden Little, Brown, 2005 (Abacus, 2006) ISBN 0-349-11541-9
- Nuremberg: Evil on Trial Headline, 2006 ISBN 0-7553-1545-6
- Danger UXB Little, Brown, 2010 ISBN 978-1-4087-0255-0
- Commando Little, Brown, 2012 ISBN 978-1-4087-0302-1
- Great Letters Times Books, 2017 ISBN 978-0008249496
- Great War Letters Times Books, 2018 ISBN 978-0008318451
- Great Quotations Times Books, 2018 ISBN 978-0008317263
- On This Day Times Books, 2018 ISBN 978-0008317416
- Great Events Times Books, 2020 ISBN 978-0008409302
