= Guy Walters =

British writer

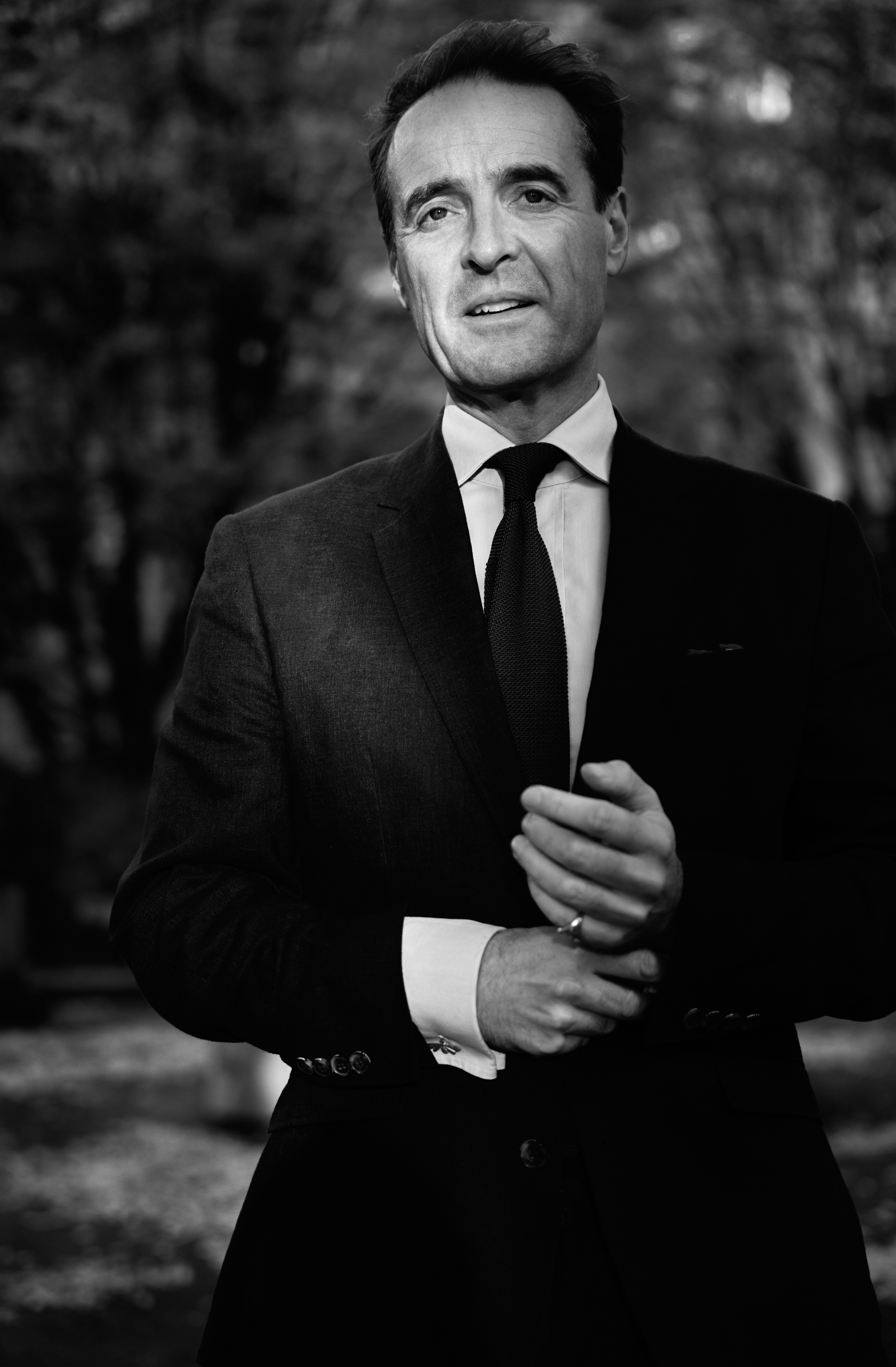
- Photographed by Antalya von Preussen in November 2023
- Born: 8 August 1971 (age 55); Kensington, London, England.
- Education: Cheam School; Eton College
- Alma mater: Westfield College, London; Newcastle University
- Children: 2

Guy Edward Barham Walters (born 8 August 1971) is a British author and journalist. He is the author and editor of nine books on the Second World War, including war thrillers, and a historical analysis of the Berlin Olympic Games.

== Early life and education ==
Walters was born in Kensington, London, on 8 August 1971. He was educated at Cheam School, Eton College and Westfield College, University of London (now part of Queen Mary, University of London).

== Career ==
From 1992 to 2000, he worked at The Times. His first book, The Traitor, was published in 2002, and concerns the British Free Corps, a British unit of the Waffen-SS. The Leader (2003) is an Alternative History set in a Britain ruled by Oswald Mosley as a Fascist dictator. The Occupation (2004) takes place during the German occupation of the Channel Islands. The Colditz Legacy (2005) is set in Colditz Castle during the war and the 1970s.

With James Owen, he edited The Voice of War in 2004, a collection of Second World War memoirs. In 2006 he published Berlin Games, a history of the 1936 Berlin Olympics, which was shortlisted for the 2006 William Hill Sports Book of the Year and the 2007 Outstanding Book of the Year by the North American Society for the Sociology of Sport.

In 2009, Walters published Hunting Evil, a history of how the Nazi war criminals escaped after the war, and how they were brought to justice. "Frustrated at the enormous amount of junk history around, Guy sees it as his personal mission to wage war on ignorance and misconceptions about the past." He was scathing about the Hitler conspiracy book and film Grey Wolf describing it as "2,000 per cent rubbish" when the book was published. Walters added: "It's an absolute disgrace. There's no substance to it at all. It appeals to the deluded fantasies of conspiracy theorists and has no place whatsoever in historical research."

Walters has raised questions regarding the veracity of Denis Avey's claims to have smuggled himself into Auschwitz. He has also questioned the level of acclaim given to Mary Seacole, saying "She was a very worthy woman, it would be churlish not to hold her up as a good role model. The problem is that, because of her colour and because of political need, her achievements are massively oversold."

In June 2013, he was appointed to the position of lecturer in modern British history at the New College of the Humanities in London.

In July and October 2020, he criticised restrictions and closures at British archives related to the COVID-19 pandemic in the UK, arguing that these were an enhanced continuation of reduced access enacted prior to the pandemic.

== Personal life ==
Walters was married to the writer Annabel Venning, from whom he is now divorced. Walters and Venning lived in Wiltshire with their two children.

== Selected publications ==
=== Fiction ===
- The Traitor (2002), ISBN 0-7553-0056-4
- The Leader (2003), ISBN 978-0552165372
- The Occupation (2004), ISBN 0-7553-2064-6
- The Colditz Legacy (2005), ISBN 0-7553-2715-2
- Diary of a Hapless Househusband (2007) (as Sam Holden), ISBN 978-0-099-50936-3
- Growing Pains of a Hapless Househusband (2008) (as Sam Holden), ISBN 978-0-09-951807-5

=== Non-fiction ===
- The Voice of War: The Second World War Told by Those Who Fought It (2004), ISBN 0-670-91423-1 (ed. with James Owen)
- Berlin Games: How Hitler Stole the Olympic Dream (2006), ISBN 0-7195-6783-1
- Hunting Evil: The Nazi War Criminals who Escaped and the Dramatic Hunt to Bring Them to Justice (2009), ISBN 978-0-593-05991-3
- The Real Great Escape (2013), ISBN 978-0-593-07190-8
- Nazis, Spies & Fakes: Ten Years at the Coalface of History (2013)
- Naumann's War: The Life of Werner Naumann from 1909 to 1945 (2016)
- Stealing Hitler's Rocket (2026)
