= Stuart Archer =

British Army officer (1915–2015)

- Born: Bertram Stuart Trevelyan Archer; 3 February 1915; Hampstead, London, England
- Died: 2 May 2015 (aged 100)
- Military career
- Allegiance: United Kingdom
- Branch: British Army
- Service years: 1940–1967
- Rank: Colonel
- Service number: 126305
- Units: Honourable Artillery Company; Royal Engineers
- Conflicts: Second World War
- Awards: George Cross; Officer of the Order of the British Empire; Emergency Reserve Decoration
- Other work: Architect

Colonel Bertram Stuart Trevelyan Archer, GC, OBE, ERD, FRIBA (3 February 1915 – 2 May 2015), known as Stuart Archer, was a recipient of the George Cross, the highest British and Commonwealth award for gallantry not in the face of the enemy. On 3 February 2015 Archer became the first recipient of the Victoria Cross or the George Cross to reach 100 years of age.

== Early life ==
Before joining the army, Archer was a qualified architect with the Royal Institute of British Architects, receiving his certification at the youngest possible age of 21. In July 1936, he started work in Gray's Inn with a firm in which he eventually became a partner and remained with for all of his working life. Upon joining the army, he first served with the Honourable Artillery Company as an enlisted soldier before joining the Royal Engineers, who carried out bomb disposal work in the United Kingdom. He received an emergency commission as a second lieutenant in the Royal Engineers on 30 March 1940, and carried out bomb disposal work from that June. He had dealt with 200 bombs prior to the awarding of the George Cross, and provided the War Office with five different fuses as well as the Zus anti-handling devices.

== Award of George Cross and citation ==
He was awarded the medal on 30 September 1941. The award was for extensive work on defusing German bombs dropped on the United Kingdom during World War II. The original announcement of the award read simply:

The KING has been graciously pleased to approve the award of the GEORGE CROSS in recognition of most conspicuous gallantry in carrying out hazardous work in a very brave manner, to: — Second-Lieutenant (Acting Lieutenant) Bertram Stuart Trevelyan Archer (126305), Corps of Royal Engineers.

The full citation is:

On the 15 July 1940, four 250 kilogram bombs were dropped on St Athan aerodrome, South Wales, two of them within 10 yards of some vitally important assembly sheds. Lieutenant Archer immediately went to the scene and the first bomb was excavated. As its fuse was expected to be booby trapped, it was loaded, with the fuse still in, on to a lorry. Lieutenant Archer himself drove the lorry to a site some two miles away and the bomb was detonated. The other bomb was dealt with in the same way.

On the 17 August 1940, at Moulton South Wales, a further 250 kilogram bomb was excavated down to the fuse pocket, which contained a number 50 fuse. As this fuse was required for War Office experiments an attempt was made to extract it. When this failed, Lieutenant Archer removed it by hand by means of a pick head; although well aware of that the fuse might be a booby trap.

On 27 August 1940 at Port Talbot docks this officer was instrumental in recovering the first number of fuses for experimental purposes.

Archer's exploits, including the circumstances of the awarding of the GC, are detailed at length in Danger UXB, a history of wartime bomb disposal by James Owen.

== Subsequent career and later life ==
At the end of the war, Archer was a lieutenant with the war-substantive rank of captain. On 10 March 1951, he was appointed to a regular commission as a captain in the emergency reserves (seniority from 19 May 1946). He was promoted to major on 30 November 1951 and to lieutenant-colonel on 7 February 1955. He was appointed an Officer of the Order of the British Empire (OBE) in the 1961 Birthday Honours. He was promoted lieutenant colonel in the regular army reserve on 1 August.

On 28 October 1963 he was appointed Honorary Colonel of the bomb disposal regiments of the Royal Engineers. He relinquished his appointment as honorary colonel on 31 March 1967.

Archer served as Chairman of the Victoria Cross and George Cross Association from 1994 to 2006, and represented the association at the funeral of the Queen Mother in 2002. He died on 2 May 2015, three months after his 100th birthday.

He was elected a Fellow of the Royal Institute of British Architects in 1970.

== See also ==
- List of George Cross recipients
