= Die Spinne =

Alleged organisation that aided SS fugitives

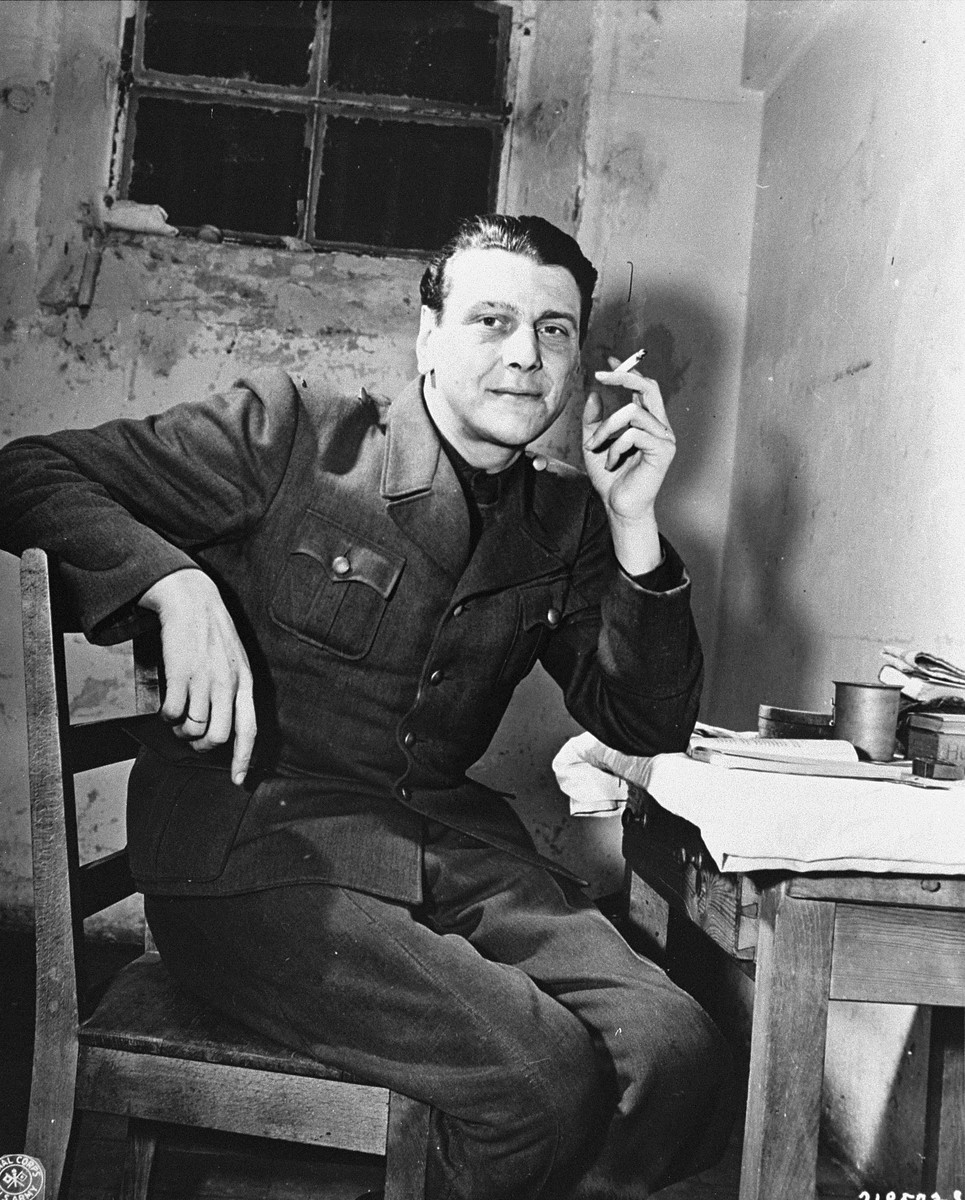
Otto Skorzeny waiting in a cell as witness at the Nuremberg trials. On 27 July 1948 Skorzeny escaped with the help of former SS officers dressed in US Military Police uniforms. He later maintained that US authorities had aided his escape and had supplied the uniforms.

Die Spinne (German for "the spider") was a post-World War II organisation that helped certain Nazi war criminals escape prosecution. Its existence is still debated to this day. It is believed by some historians to be a different name for, or a branch of ODESSA, an organisation established during the collapse of Nazi Germany, similar to Kameradenwerk and der Bruderschaft, and devoted to helping German war criminals flee Europe. It was led in part by Otto Skorzeny (Hitler's commando chief), as well as by German intelligence officer Reinhard Gehlen. Die Spinne helped as many as 600 former Schutzstaffel men escape from Germany to Francoist Spain, Juan Perón's Argentina, Paraguay, Chile, Bolivia, the Middle East and elsewhere.

Skorzeny, Gehlen and their network of collaborators gained significant influence in parts of Europe and Latin America. Skorzeny travelled between Francoist Spain and Argentina, where he acted as an adviser to President Juan Perón and as a bodyguard of Eva Perón, while fostering an ambition for a "Fourth Reich" centred in Latin America.

The idea for the Spinne network began in 1944 when Gehlen, then working as a senior Wehrmacht intelligence officer as the head of Foreign Armies East, foresaw a possible defeat of Nazi Germany due to Axis military failures in the Soviet Union. T. H. Tetens, an expert on German geopolitics and a member of the US War Crimes Commission in 1946–47, referred to a group overlapping with die Spinne as the Führungsring ("a kind of political Mafia, with headquarters in Madrid... serving various purposes".) The Madrid office built up what was referred to as a sort of Fascist international. The German leadership also included Dr. Hans Globke, who in 1936 had written an official commentary on the Nuremberg Laws of 1935. Globke held the important position of Director of the German Chancellery from 1953 to 1963, serving as adviser to Chancellor Konrad Adenauer.

Breitman and Goda give a somewhat different account of die Spinne:

The Spinne is the stuff of legend. It was 'uncovered' in 1949 by the American journalist Curt Reiss who wrote that Goebbels's subordinate Dr. Johannes Leers stood at its head. In the 1960s it was said to be a secret organization of former Nazis with high contacts in West Germany that helped war criminals escape to the Middle East, South Africa, and elsewhere. [...] The true Spinne was actually a secret association of Austrian Nazis who in 1949 pressed for the rehabilitation of Austrian Nazis and for a pan-German agenda that included a second Anschluss with a reunited Germany.

== The "Fascist International" ==
From 1945 to 1950, Die Spinne's leader Skorzeny facilitated the escape of Nazi war criminals from war-criminal prisons to Memmingen, Bavaria, through Austria and Switzerland into Italy. Certain US military authorities allegedly knew of the escape, but took no action. The Central European headquarters of Die Spinne as of 1948 was in Gmunden, Upper Austria.

A coordinating office for international Die Spinne operations was established in Madrid by Skorzeny under the control of Francisco Franco, whose victory in the Spanish Civil War had been aided by economic and military support from Hitler and Mussolini. When a Die Spinne Nazi delegation visited Madrid in 1959, Franco stated, "Please regard Spain as your second Fatherland." Skorzeny used Die Spinne's resources to allow notorious Nazi concentration camp doctor Joseph Mengele to escape to Argentina in 1949.

Skorzeny requested assistance from German industrialist tycoon Alfried Krupp, whose company had controlled 138 private concentration camps in Nazi Germany; the assistance was granted in 1951. Skorzeny became Krupp's representative in industrial business ventures in Argentina, a country which harboured a strong pro-Nazi political element throughout World War II and afterwards, regardless of a nominal declaration of loyalty to the Allies as World War II ended. With the help of Die Spinne leaders in Spain, by the early 1980s Die Spinne had become influential in Argentina, Chile and Paraguay, including ties involving Paraguayan dictator Alfredo Stroessner.

War crimes investigator Simon Wiesenthal claimed Joseph Mengele had stayed at the notorious Colonia Dignidad Nazi colony in Chile in 1979, and ultimately found harbour in Paraguay until his death. As of the early 1980s, Die Spinne's Mengele was reported by Infield to have been advising Stroessner's ethnic German Paraguayan police on how to reduce native Paraguayan Indians in the Chaco Region to slave labour. A wealthy, powerful post–World War II underground Nazi political contingent held sway in Argentina as of the late 1960s, which included many ethnic German Nazi immigrants and their descendants.

== In popular culture ==
The "Spinne" network in Spain is the focus of the 1966 Nick Carter spy novel Web of Spies.

"THRUSH" ("WASP") from the TV-series (as well as the unnamed antagonist in the movie) called The Man from U.N.C.L.E., is built upon Die Spinne.

Ian Fleming (who allegedly was the MI6 handler in real life "Operation James Bond" to extract Bormann out of Berlin) had in his fictional James Bond series Bormann's network in mind for "Octopussy" (Die Spinne) and S.P.E.C.T.R.E. (Die Spinne / O.D.E.S.S.A.).

In Michael A. Kahn's legal mystery or thriller Bearing Witness an age discrimination case ultimately leads back to a decades-old post-war conspiracy involving American Nazis linked to Die Spinne.

== See also ==
- Gehlen Organization

== Bibliography ==
- Infield, Glenn. The Secrets of the SS. Stein and Day, New York, 1981; ISBN 0-8128-2790-2.
- Tetens, T.H. The New Germany and the Old Nazis. Random House/Marzani+Munsel, 1961; LCN 61-7240.
- Wechsberg, Joseph. The Murderers Among Us. McGraw Hill, New York, 1967; LCN 67-13204.
