= Criminales de guerra =

1946 Argentine documentary film

- Directed by: Júpiter Perruzi
- Produced by: Imágenes Argentinas
- Narrated by: Carlos A. Taquini
- Release date: 3 January 1946
- Running time: 90 minutes
- Country: Argentina
- Language: Spanish

Criminales de guerra (English: The War's Murder) is a 1946 Argentine documentary film directed by Júpiter Perruzi. The film was made using excerpts of international news programs that covered the Nuremberg Trials. Additional commentaries and illustrative maps are also shown.
