= Eric Frattini =

Spanish writer

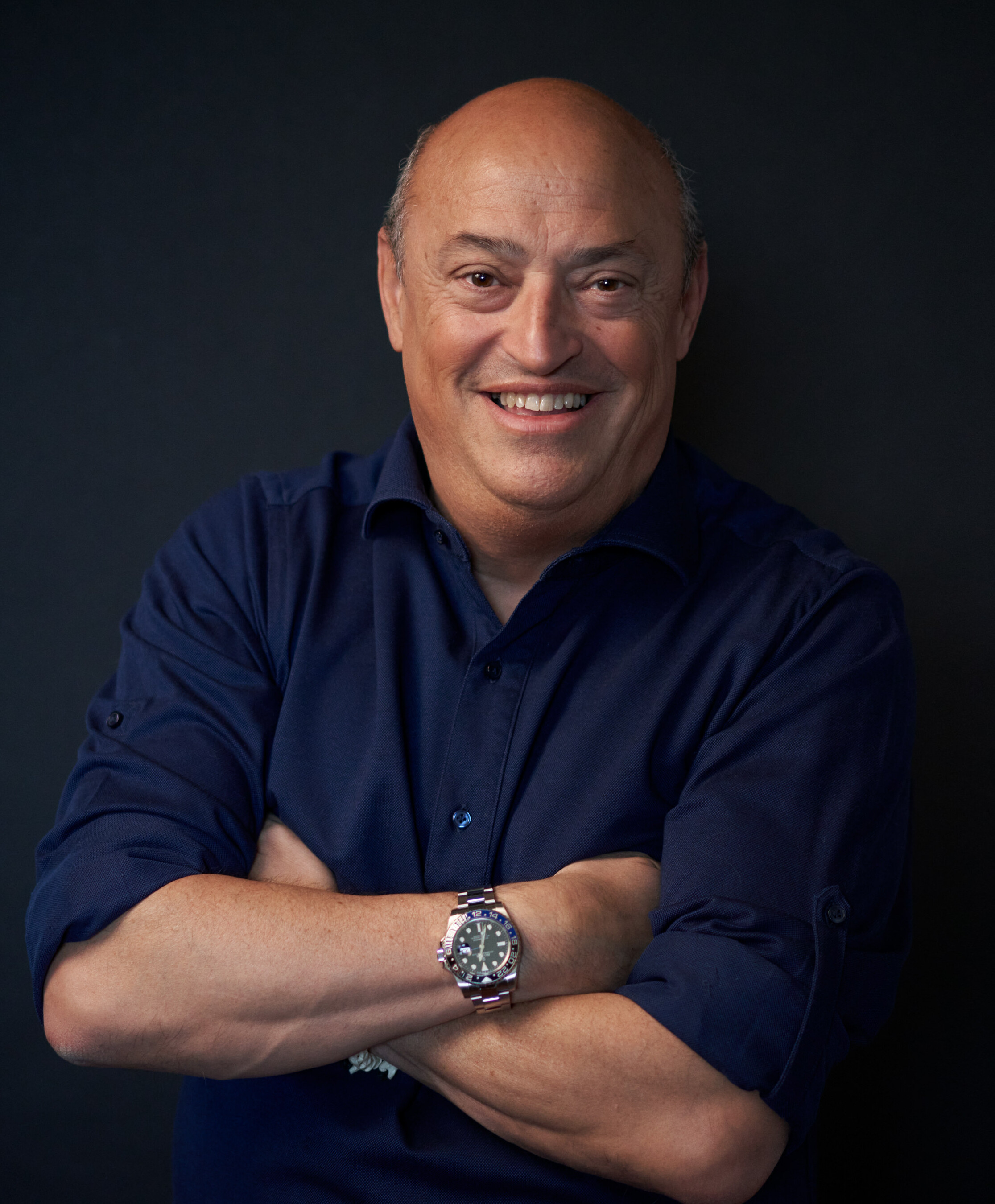
- Frattini in 2022
- Born: 1963 (age 62–63) Lima, Peru

Eric Frattini (born 1963 in Lima) is a Spanish writer.

== Works ==
- La Entrevista. El arte y la ciencia (1994) ISBN 84-7754-202-3
- Tiburones de la Comunicación (1996) ISBN 84-368-0984-X
- Guía Básica del Cómic (1998) ISBN 84-8068-054-7
- Guía de las Organizaciones Internacionales (1998) ISBN 84-89784-60-4
- Osama bin Laden, la espada de Alá (2002) ISBN 84-9734-024-8
- Mafia S.A. 100 años de Cosa Nostra (2002) ISBN 978-84-670-1753-3
- Irak, el Estado incierto (2003) ISBN 978-84-670-0411-3
- Secretos Vaticanos (2003) ISBN 978-84-414-1408-2
- La Santa Alianza, cinco siglos de espionaje vaticano (2004) ISBN 978-84-670-1893-6 English translation as The Entity: Five Centuries of Secret Vatican Espionage. St. Martin's Press. ISBN 978-0-312-37594-2
- ONU, historia de la corrupción (2005) ISBN 978-84-670-1933-9
- CIA, Historia de la Compañía (2006) ISBN 84-414-1707-5
- KGB, Historia del Centro (2006) ISBN 978-84-414-1708-3
- MOSSAD, Historia del Instituto (2006) ISBN 978-84-414-1744-1
- MI6, Historia de la Firma (2006) ISBN 978-84-414-1745-8
- La Conjura, Matar a Lorenzo de' Medici (2006) ISBN 978-84-670-2210-0
- Kidon, los verdugos de Israel (2006) ISBN 84-9734-472-3
- El Polonio y otras maneras de matar. Así asesinan los servicios secretos (2007) ISBN 978-84-670-2511-8
- El Quinto Mandamiento (2007) ISBN 978-84-670-2442-5
- Los Espías del Papa (2008) ISBN 978-84-670-2707-5
- CIA. Joyas de Familia (2008) ISBN 978-84-270-3442-6
- El Laberinto de Agua (2009) ISBN 978-84-670-3053-2
- Los Papas y el Sexo. De san Pedro a Benedicto XVI (2010) ISBN 978-84-670-3210-9
- El Oro de Mefisto (2010) ISBN 978-84-670-3422-6
- Mossad, los verdugos del Kidon (2011) ISBN 978-84-938718-6-4
- Los cuervos del Vaticano. Benedicto XVI en la encrucijada (2012) ISBN 978-84-670-0939-2
- La lenta agonía de los peces (2013) ISBN 978-84-670-2864-5
- Italia, sorvegliata speciale (2013) ISBN 978-88-6833-029-3
- La CIA en el Vaticano. De Juan Pablo II a Francisco (2014) ISBN 978-88-200-5663-6
- Muerte a la Carta. 50 últimas cenas de 50 grandes personajes de la historia (2014) ISBN 978-84-943301-0-0 Prólogo de Juan Echanove
- ¿Murió Hitler en el búnker? (2015) ISBN 978-84-9998-474-2
- La CIA en el Vaticano. De Pius XII a Paul VI (2016) ISBN
- La isla del día siguiente. Crónica de una travesía por el Océano Pacífico (2016) ISBN 978-84-945766-5-2 Prólogo de Diego Fructuoso
- Manipulando la historia. Operaciones de Falsa Bandera. Del Maine al Golpe de estado de Turquía. (2017) ISBN 978-84-9998-584-8 Prólogo de Pedro Baños
- La Huida de las Ratas. Cómo escaparon de Europa los criminales de guerra nazis (2018) ISBN 978-84-9998-667-8
- Los Científicos de Hitler. Historia de la Ahnenerbe (2021) ISBN 978-84-670-6109-3 Prólogo de Diego Moldes
- Mossad el largo brazo de Israel (2021) ISBN 978-84-18151-42-2
- El libro negro de Vladímir Putin (2022) ISBN 978-84-670-6767-5 Pág. 433 coordinado por Galia Ackerman y Stéphane Courtois
- El paciente A. Historia médica de Adolf Hitler (2025) ISBN 978-84-670-7560-1; foreword by Doctor José Cabrera y Forneiro
- Cónclave. La Iglesia después de Francisco (2025) ISBN 978-84-670-7796-4
