= Daniel Stahl =

Daniel Stahl may refer to:

- Daniel Stahl (game designer) (born 1971), American game designer
- Daniel Ståhl (born 1992), Swedish discus thrower
