= Bruce Lawrence =

American Professor of Religion (born 1941)

Bruce B. Lawrence
- Born: August 14, 1941 (age 85); Newton, New Jersey, U.S.
- Education: Princeton University; Yale University
- Scientific career
- Fields: History of Islam
- Workplaces: Duke University

Bruce Bennett Lawrence (born August 14, 1941) is the Nancy and Jeffrey Marcus Humanities Professor of Religion at Duke University. He has taught at Duke since 1971.

== Education ==
A graduate of Fay School, Phillips Exeter Academy and Princeton University, with a Master of Divinity from Episcopal Divinity School (Cambridge, Massachusetts, USA), he earned his doctorate at Yale University in History of Religions. There he was trained to engage West Asia (aka the Middle East) and South Asia, with particular reference to the cultures and languages, the history and religious practices marked as Muslim. But he also concerns himself with the non-Muslim religious traditions of Asia, especially Hinduism, Buddhism, Sikhism and Jainism, at the same time that he pursues the turbulent reconnections of Europe to Asia forged in colonial, then post-colonial encounters.

== Writing ==
His early books explored the intellectual and social history of Asian Muslims. Shahrastani on the Indian Religions (1976) was followed by Notes from a Distant Flute (1978), The Rose and the Rock (1979) and Ibn Khaldun and Islamic Ideology (1984).

Since the mid-1980s, he has been concerned with the interplay between religion and ideology. The test case of fundamentalism became the topic of his award-winning monograph, Defenders of God: The Fundamentalist Revolt against the Modern Age (1989/1995). A parallel but more limited enquiry informed his latest monograph, Shattering the Myth: Islam beyond Violence (1998/2000). It is the thorny issue of religious pluralism and diasporic communities that guide his monograph on Asian religions in America (Columbia University Press, November 2002). New Faiths/Old Fears concerns Asian religions in America, especially since 1965; it examines the challenge of their spiritual practices to North American norms and values.

He has also written three collaborative works with colleagues from the Triangle area. The first, Beyond Turk and Hindu: Contesting Islamicate India, was edited with Professor David Gilmartin of North Carolina State University, and published by the University Press of Florida in December 2000 (with an Indian edition in September 2002). The other was co-written with Professor Carl Ernst of the University of North Carolina. Sufi Martyrs to Love: The Chishti Brotherhood in South Asia and Beyond, was published from Palgrave Press, also in November 2002.

With his Duke colleague and spouse, Dr. Miriam Cooke of Asian and African Languages and Literatures, he co-edited Muslim Networks from Hajj to Hip Hop, published in March 2005 by UNC Press in a series that he also co-edits, with Professor Ernst, on Islamic civilization and Muslim Networks.

His most recent work the Qur’an, The Qur’an: A Verse Translation (Liveright, 2024) he co-translated with his colleague M.A.R. Habib, an English professor at Rutgers University. It translates the entirety of the Qur’an capturing the poetic sensibility of the Qur’an for contemporary English speakers.
