= Hernán Zin =

Argentine-Italian filmmaker (born 1971)

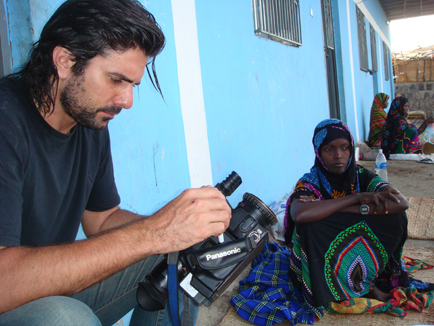
- Zin in Ethiopia, July 2007
- Born: 1971 (age 54–55); Buenos Aires, Argentina
- Occupation: Film Director
- Website: Web personal

Hernán Zin (born 1971) is an Argentine-Italian war correspondent, writer, producer and filmmaker based in Madrid, Spain. Since 1994, he has traveled around the globe directing documentary films, writing books and contributing to news outlets.

He has worked in more than 80 countries in Asia, Africa, Latin America and Europe. War, poverty, the environment and human rights are the main subjects of his work.

From 1994 to 1998 he was based in Calcutta, India, where he created homes for street children and produced his first documentary "Calcuta, vida en la estación de la muerte". The second part of the documentary was presented by Penelope Cruz and the music score was composed by Alejandro Sanz.

Five of his documentary films have been premiered by Netflix worldwide. And the rest of his films and series were released by HBO, Amazon Prime Video, National Geographic, Canal Plus and dozens of TV stations around the world.

His books have been published in more than 20 countries.

He is the son of Italian senator Claudio Zin and dated the Grammy Award-winning Spanish singer Bebe and the awarded actress Nerea Barros.

== Journalism ==
As a free lance journalist he contributed to The New York Times, Rolling Stone, Esquire, El Pais, El Mundo, La Nación, Clarín, ABC, La Voz de Galicia, 20 Minutos.

In 2002, his research into European and American pedophile networks in Cambodia, published in the newspaper El Mundo and in the book "Helado y patatas fritas", lead into the detention of half a dozen pedophiles.

From 2006 to 2015 he wrote the blog "Trip to War" for the newspaper 20 Minutos. This blog took him to DR Congo, Somalia, Afghanistan, Gaza, Lebanon, Sudan, Uganda, Rwanda, Brazil, Kenya and Bosnia and Herzegovina. Its aim was to give voice to the victims of war. In 2011 the blog was nominated to the BOBs Awards.

From 2011 to 2015 he worked for Canal Plus producing and filming documentaries from Afghanistan, Somalia, Uganda, Kenya, Tanzania, USA, Argentina, Honduras, Mexico, India and Argentina. This show won the Ondas Award and two nominations for the Spanish TV Academy Awards.

When he was shooting the documentary "Hooligans" in Argentina, he was beaten and robbed by a mob of Independiente Club fans.

In 2015, he was nominated to the Rory Peck Awards, that recognizes the best war reporters in the world.

More than a decade after the release of Born in Gaza (2014), Hernán Zin returned to the project with We Are All Gaza (2025), aiming to document how the war has affected the lives of the children featured in the original film.

== Production companies ==
In 2002 he founded Doc Land Films in Madrid, one of the leading documentary production companies in Europe.

In 2020, Doc Land Films opened offices in Dubai and Los Angeles.

In 2021 he founded Pod Land, a leading podcast production company in the Spanish speaking world.

He is the current CEO of Doc Land Films and Pod Land.

== Filmography ==
- ¿Qué horas son? (2022) - director, producer, scriptwriter.
- 13 Days - documentary series (2022) - director, scriptwriter.
- The Sightseers (2022) - director, producer, scriptwriter.
- The Dictator's Tomb (2022) - director, producer, scriptwriter.
- Letizia, Queen (2022) - director, scriptwriter.
- Raíces - documentary series (2022) - director, scriptwriter.
- We are Unique (2022) - director, scriptwriter.
- Pandemic Tour Belako (2021) - director, producer, scriptwriter.
- Memory (2021) - producer.
- Fortuna (2021) - producer.
- 57 Days (2020) - producer.
- 2020 (2020) - director, producer, scriptwriter.
- Angels With Swords (2020) - producer.
- The State Against Pablo Ibar - documentary series (2019) - DOP.
- Dying to tell (2018) - director, producer, scriptwriter.
- Giants (2018) - director, scriptwriter.
- Born in Syria (2017) - director, producer, scriptwriter, DOP.
- Bandoliers (2017) - director, producer, scriptwriter.
- 10 Years with Bebe (2016) - director, producer, scriptwriter, DOP.
- Kenya, Blood Tusks (2015) - producer, DOP.
- Matadoras (2015) - director, producer, scriptwriter, DOP.
- 10 Elephants (2015) - director, producer, scriptwriter.
- Rwanda, How to Organize a Genocide (2014) - producer, DOP.
- Born in Gaza (2014) - director, producer, scriptwriter, DOP.
- Honduras, Living with the Maras (2014) - producer, DOP.
- India, No Country for Women (2014) - producer, DOP.
- War Against Women (2013) - director, producer, scriptwriter, DOP.
- Extreme America (2013) - producer, DOP.
- Uganda, hunting the gays (2013) - producer, DOP.
- I Want to be Messi (2013) - director, producer, scriptwriter, DOP.
- Afghanistan, Walking Over Bombs (2012) - producer, DOP.
- Hooligans (2012) - producer, DOP.
- Warlords (2011) - producer, DOP.
- Women that Change the World - documentary series (2011) - director, producer, scriptwriter, DOP.
- Kill the Albinos (2011) - producer, DOP.
- Slum World (2009) - director, producer, scriptwriter, DOP.

== Awards ==
- 2022: Emmy Awards. Nomination. "57 Days".
- 2022: Guadalajara International Film Festival. Official Selection "Memory".
- 2022: Málaga Film Festival. Official Selection "Memory".
- 2022: Academy Awards Candidate "57 Days".
- 2021: San Sebastián Film Festival. Official Selection "Pandemic Tour Belako".
- 2021: FlickerFest. Best Documentary Short "57 Days".
- 2020: Huelva Ibero-American Film Festival. Juror's Award "2020".
- 2020: Huelva Ibero-American Film Festival. Audience Award "2020".
- 2020: Valladolid International Film Festival. Tiempo de Historia Award "57 Days".
- 2018: Montreal Film Festival. Best Documentary "Dying to Tell".
- 2018: Valladolid International Film Festival. Best Documentary "Dying to Tell".
- 2017: Platino Awards. Best Documentary "Born in Syria".
- 2017: Iris Awards. "Born in Syria".
- 2017: Goya Awards. Nominee Best Documentary "Born in Syria"
- 2017: Forqué Awards. Best Documentary "Born in Syria"
- 2017: CEC Awards. Best Documentary "Born in Syria"
- 2016: Latin Grammy. Nominee Best Documentary "10 years With Bebe"
- 2016: Forqué Awards. Best Documentary "Born in Gaza"
- 2015: Goya Awards. Nominee Best Documentary "Born in Gaza"
- 2015: Platino Awards. Nominee Best Documentary "Born in Gaza"
- 2015: Rory Peck Award. Finalist. "Born in Gaza"
- 2014: CEC Awards. Best Documentary "Born in Gaza"
- 2014: Iris Awards. Nominee "Canal Plus Stories"
- 2013: Iris Awards. Nominee "Canal Plus Stories"
- 2010: International TV Academy Award for his defense of Human Rights.

== Books ==
- Querida guerra mía (La Esfera de los Libros, 2018). ISBN 978-8491642541
- Llueve sobre Gaza (BDE Books, 2007) ISBN 978-8466631952
- La libertad del compromiso (Plaza and Janes, 2005) ISBN 978-8401379079
- Helado y patatas fritas (Plaza and Janes, 2003) ISBN 978-8401378430
- Un voluntario en Calcuta (Ediciones Martínez Roca, 2002) ISBN 978-8484602286
