= Annabel Venning =

British author and journalist

Annabel Venning is a British author and journalist. She was educated at University College, Durham. After working at the Daily Mail in London, she left to write Following the Drum: The Lives of Army Wives and Daughters Past and Present (2005). In 2019 she published her second book, To War With the Walkers: One Family's Extraordinary Story of the Second World War.

Venning is the granddaughter of General Sir Walter Walker, a senior British soldier in the post-World War II period.

Venning divides her working time between journalism including travel writing - and books. She has two adult children and lives in Wiltshire.

== Bibliography ==
- Following the Drum (2005), ISBN 0-7553-1259-7
- To War with the Walkers (2019), ISBN 1-4736-7930-3
