= Kidnapping of Antonio Pampliega, José Manuel López and Ángel Sastre =

High-profile disappearance

Antonio Pampliega
- Born: c. 1982; Madrid
- Disappeared: July 13, 2015 (aged 32–33); Syria
- Education: Universidad Europea
- Occupation: Freelance journalist
- Employer: Agence France Press (as a contributor)

On July 13, 2015, Spanish freelance journalists Antonio Pampliega, José Manuel López and Ángel Sastre went missing inside Syria around Aleppo during the Syrian civil war. The journalists returned to Spain on 8 May 2016, after being released by the Al-Nusra Front.

== Personal ==
Jose Manuel López
- Born: c. 1971; Madrid
- Disappeared: July 13, 2015 (aged 43–44); Syria
- Occupation: Freelance photojournalist
- Employer: Agence France Press (as a contributor)

Antonio Pampliega was born in 1982.

Jose Manuel López was born in Madrid, Spain in 1971.

Ángel Sastre Canelas was born around 1981 in Don Benito, Badajoz, Extremadura, Spain. Before his disappearance, he was based in Buenos Aires, Argentina, where he resides. He wrote a blog called Machedtada, where he discusses his views on his industry.

== Career ==
Ángel Sastre Canelas
- Born: c. 1981; Don Benito, Province of Badajoz, Extremadura, Spain
- Disappeared: July 13, 2015 (aged 33–34); Syria
- Occupations: Journalism, television, radio, and print
- Awards: Premio Larra de periodismo

Antonio Pampliega worked as a freelancer for Agence France-Press among others. Pampliega had recently become a part of the "Infilitrados" program that was broadcast on Cuatro, and he was an associate producer for "Cuerdos de Atar". Antonio had friends that were kidnapped before him. He did not let this deter him, and he wanted to continue covering the happenings in Syria.

Jose Manuel López has been a photojournalist, primarily working in war zones such as Afghanistan, Iraq, Palestine, Kosovo, and Iran for the last 11 years. He began his career at The Chronicle of Leon. He has been honored for his work over and over again. He received a gold medal in his category for his story about civil defense units of the Syrian city of Aleppo. In Paris, he won the Px3 Prix of Photography Award, and just recently he received the Prix Luchetta Photography Marco Image for his photograph of Somali children playing in the ruins of Mogashishu.

Ángel Sastre Canelas is a journalist who has worked in television, radio, and print. He regularly worked with the Spanish television network, Cuatro, radio station Onda Cero, and the newspaper, La Razon. In addition, he was a contributor to Telecinco, Antena 3, and El Confidencial. From a young age, Sastre dreamed of being a journalist. For the last nine years, he has worked in the riskiest parts of the world. He was the recipient of the Larra Award in 2010. He stated, "The journalist's mission is to bother the power and denounce injustice, inequality, and abuse. We want to go where people do not go, because as Gervasio Sanchez said, 'wars without journalists are worse.'"

== Disappearance ==
Aleppo is located within Syria and shown relative to the capital Damascus.

Over 90 journalists have been abducted in Syria since the beginning of the Syrian conflict with an estimated 25 journalists missing.

All three men have worked in many war zones. Pampliega and Sastre also spent a month reporting in Aleppo in October 2013. At the time of their disappearance, they were freelancing in Aleppo, where they were reporting on the Syrian Civil War. They entered Syria from Turkey on 10 July 2015. They were last heard from on 12 July, and it is assumed they disappeared 13 July. The Spanish Federation of Journalists reported the group missing.

Since the incident, a fourth Japanese journalist, Jumpei Yasuda, has also been kidnapped. He has been vaguely reported to also have been taken by Syrian officials.

== Impact ==
Since the many disappearances of journalists in Syria since 2013 due to the rise of the Islamic State group, most media organizations have decided that it is safer to avoid covering the events in Syria. There is an unacceptable risk level. Since the beginning of 2015, it is rare for any non-native journalist to go into northern Syria, where al-Qaida and Isis are most prominent.

== Context ==
In the city Aleppo, there has been severe fighting between regime and rebel forces, including ISIL. It is rumored that the journalists were captured by unknown gunmen dressed in Afghan and Pakistani style clothing whom were traveling in a minivan. There have been no reports on whether or not the kidnappers want a ransom. There has not been much information released, as Syrian officials afraid of retaliation.

== Reactions ==
Christophe Deloire, secretary-general of Reporters Without Borders, said, "We are very concerned about the fate of these three Spanish journalists, who disappeared in Aleppo, a city controlled partly by Islamic State and partly by Al-Nusra Front, another armed group. We urge the Spanish government to use all possible means to find these journalists and we appeal to all parties to the conflict to respect the work of the media and to stop taking hostages for political ends. The UN Security Council's recent Resolution 2222 pointed out that journalists covering armed conflicts are civilians, that they cannot be deliberately targeted and that they enjoy special protection."

Sherif Mansour, Middle East program coordinator for Committee to Protect Journalists, said, "The disappearance of these four journalists underscores that Syria remains an extremely risky place for the press. The media are at the mercy of all sides in the conflict, which have consistently shown not only a disregard for civilians' rights but a willingness to use journalists for their own deadly purposes."

== See also ==
- List of kidnappings
- List of solved missing person cases (post-2000)
