= Ricardo Garcia Vilanova =

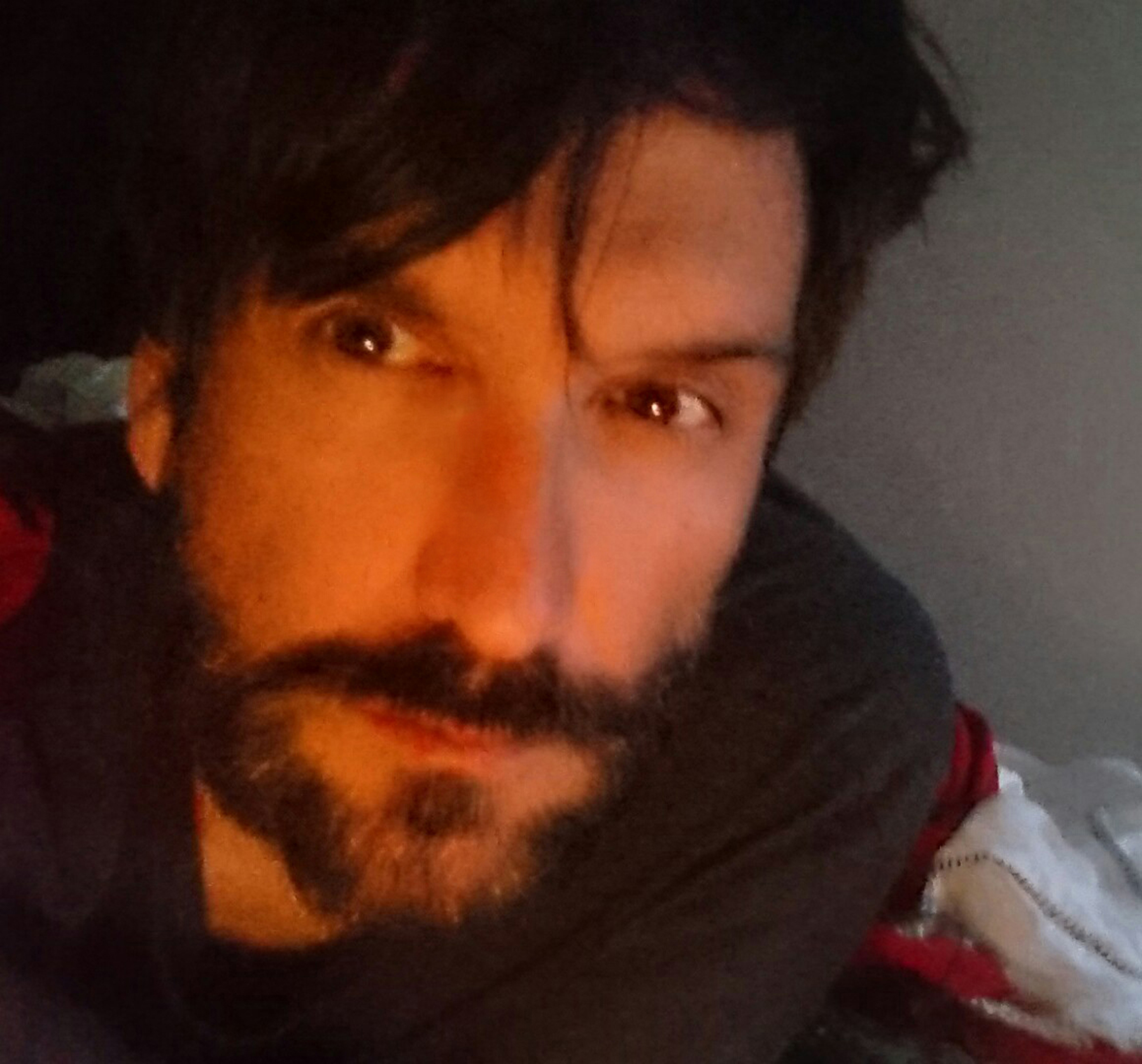
- Born: Ricard Garcia Vilanova; 1971 (age 53–54); Barcelona
- Occupation: photojournalist

Ricardo Garcia Vilanova (born 1971, Barcelona) is a freelance Catalan photojournalist and videojournalist, specialized in conflict zones and humanitarian crises. He has reported on the Arab Spring and ISIS conflicts. He has published his work for journals and magazines like Life, Newsweek, Time, The New York Times, The Washington Post, The Wall Street Journal, Le Monde, Liberation, Paris Match, The Guardian, The Times, Die Welt, Der Spiegel, Stern, and many more. As a freelance video journalist, he has worked with CNN, BBC, Aljazeera, Channel 4, VICE, PBS, and Euronews, among others.

== Biography ==
He studied photography at the Polytechnic University of Catalonia. He also studied image and sound at the School of Audiovisual Media of Barcelona (EMAV). He started as a freelance journalist in Africa, working for NGOs. In Afghanistan he met James Wellford, publisher of the Newsweek American magazine. Welford opened him the door to other international media, such as the Wall Street Journal, whose cover came to publish his works.

In November 2011, as part of the so-called Arab Spring, he infiltrated Jabal al-Zawiya, in the province of Idlib, and attended the first demonstrations against the Bashar al-Assad regime. Ricard Garcia Vilanova works with both a camera and a video camera. He uses a wide-angle lens for both tools. During the Libyan civil war, Garcia Vilanova made, together with Alberto Arce, his first documentary, Misrata, to win or die (2011), a Rory Peck Award winner. Thereafter he combined video and photography with an adapted wit that allows him to hold both cameras at the same time.

He arrived in Syria in October 2011 and followed that country's conflict from the first popular protests until March 2014. During the Syrian Civil War, on September 16, 2013, he was abducted with journalist Javier. Thorny at the border control of Tell Abyad, in the governorate of Ar-Raqqa, by Islamic State, as they attempted to leave Syria after two weeks covering the conflict. On October 4, the journalist Marc Marginedas had also been captured in Syria.

In 2015, the Ricard Garcia Vilanova, llampades en la foscor solo exhibit took place at La Virreina Center of Image, in Barcelona, curated by Ricard Mas Peinado.

== Prizes and awards ==
He was candidate for the Pulitzer Prize in 2010, as promoted by The Wall Street Journal. Since then, he has been awarded with PX3 four times, and is a two-time winner from the following organisations: Pictures of the Year (POY), International Photography Awards (IPA), Moscow International Foto Awards, and LensCulture. He has also received awards from the Bayeux Calvados-Normandy Award, National Press Photographers Association (NPPA), Days Japan International, Mika Yamamoto International Journalist Award, and the International Press Club. As a video journalist, he has received the Rory Peck award. He has been named finalist of the 2020 World Press Photo of the Year Award.

== Publications ==
- Fade to black. Rise and fall of the caliphate of ISIS. 2011-2019 Syria, Iraq and Libya
