= Richard Totman =

British psychologist (1949–2009)

Richard Grenfell Totman
- Born: September 1949; Chelsea, London
- Died: 15 January 2009 (aged 59); Haywards Heath, West Sussex
- Citizenship: British
- Occupation: Psychologist

Academic background
- Education: University College London
- Thesis: Cognitive dissonance and the placebo response (1974)

Academic work
- Discipline: Psychology
- Sub-discipline: Psychosomatics
- Institutions: Oxford University

Richard Grenfell Totman (1949–2009) was a British psychologist who conducted sustained research on psychosomatics.

== Biography ==
Totman was born in London in 1949. He was educated at St Edmund's School Canterbury and then proceed to University College London from which he graduated with a First Class Honours degree in Psychology in 1971, winning the Science Faculty Medal. He continued at UCL with funding from the Medical Research Council (United Kingdom) and obtained a Ph.D. in psychology in 1974. He then gained a Prize Research Fellowship at Nuffield College followed by a Fellowship at Linacre College, University of Oxford. Afterwards he worked for a period as an Honorary Research Fellow and part-time lecturer in psychology at the University of Sussex.

His career then took a turn and he worked for a short period as a theatre director. He also travelled around Asia where he became interested in the subject of kathoey. He taught for a period in Thailand. When he returned to England he worked as a therapist.

== Research ==
At the beginning of his career he was interested in the field of psychosomatics. The placebo effect was the subject of his PhD. He quickly published several articles from his thesis (Totman, 1973, 1975, 1976). He continued this line of research at Oxford University developing a more social psychological approach to illness. He conducted research at the Common Cold Unit exploring the role of psychological factors in the common cold (Totman, Reid & Craig, 1977; Totman et al., 1980). His first book integrating these findings (Totman, 1979) attracted a lot of interest. He argued that "people in their dealings with others follow rules. When they stop following rules, for whatever reason, they are likely to become ill" (Totman, 1979, p. 20). This work was a notable early contribution to the later development of health psychology in the UK.

He was particularly interested in the ethogenic approach developed by Rom Harré and Paul F. Secord. He argued that it was compatible with the traditional social psychological approach (Totman, 1980).

In his travels in Thailand he became interested in the nature of gender identity (Totman, 1982). He was especially interested in the kathoey, the Thai term for ladyboys. He collected detailed narrative accounts of the lives of four of these individuals: two cabaret performers, a waitress/escort/prostitute, and a bank clerk. (Totman, 1982). His book attracted attention.

== Publications ==
- Totman, R.G. (1973). An Approach to Cognitive Dissonance Theory in Terms of Ordinary Language. Journal for the Theory of Social Behaviour, 3 (2), 215–238.
- Totman, R.G. (1975). Cognitive dissonance and the placebo response: The effect of differential justification for undergoing dummy injections. European Journal of Social Psychology, 5 (4), 441–456.
- Totman, R.G. (1976). Cognitive dissonance in the placebo treatment of insomnia-a pilot experiment. British Journal of Medical Psychology, 49 (4), 393–400.
- Totman, R.G., Reed, S.E., & Craig, J.W. (1977). Cognitive dissonance, stress and virus-induced common colds. Journal of psychosomatic research, 21 (1), 55–63
- Totman, R.G. (1979). What makes ‘life events’ stressful? A retrospective study of patients who have suffered a first myocardial infarction. Journal of Psychosomatic Research, 23 (3), 193–201.
- Totman, R., Kiff, J., Reed, S.E., & Craig, J.W. (1980). Predicting experimental colds in volunteers from different measures of recent life stress. Journal of Psychosomatic Research, 24 (3), 155–163
- Totman, R.G. (1980). The incompleteness of ethogenics. European Journal of Social Psychology, 10 (1), 17–41.
- Totman, R.G. (1979). Social Causes of Illness. London: Souvenir Press.
- Totman, R.G. (1982). The Third Sex-Kathoey: Thailand's Ladyboys. London: Souvenir Press.
- Totman, R.G. (1985). Social and biological roles of language. The psychology of justification. London: Academic Press.
- Totman, R.G. (1990). Mind, Stress and Health. London: Souvenir Press.
