= St Edmund's School Canterbury =

Location
- St Thomas' Hill; Canterbury, Kent, CT2 8HU; England
- 51°17′30″N 1°03′35″E

Information
- Type: Public school Private day and boarding school
- Motto: Latin: "Fungar Vice Cotis" (Be as a whetstone for others to be sharpened upon)
- Religious affiliation: Church of England
- Established: 1749; 277 years ago
- Local authority: Kent
- Department for Education URN: 118998 Tables
- Chairman of Governors: Air Marshal C.M. Nickols, CB, CBE, MA, FRAeS
- Head: Edward O’Connor
- Gender: Coeducational
- Age: 3 to 18
- Enrolment: 570
- Colours: Red & Black
- Former pupils: Old Edmundians
- Yearbook: "The Chronicle"
- Website: www.stedmunds.org.uk

St Edmund's School Canterbury is a private day and boarding school located in Canterbury, Kent, England and established in 1749. The extensive school grounds were acquired in 1855. The school currently caters for girls and boys aged 3–18, including the Choristers of Canterbury Cathedral.

The school charges full boarders up to £40,272 per annum (2021/2022) and is among the most expensive Headmasters' and Headmistresses' Conference (HMC) schools in the UK.

The School is currently headed by Edward O'Connor (2018 – Present).

== History ==
St Edmund's School Canterbury was first established in 1749, as the Clergy Orphan Society (later the Clergy Orphan Corporation) in Yorkshire. In 1812, the school moved to St John's Wood at the nursery end of Lord's Cricket Ground. An associated school for girls was located on the same site, but later moved to become St Margaret's School, Bushey, in Hertfordshire.

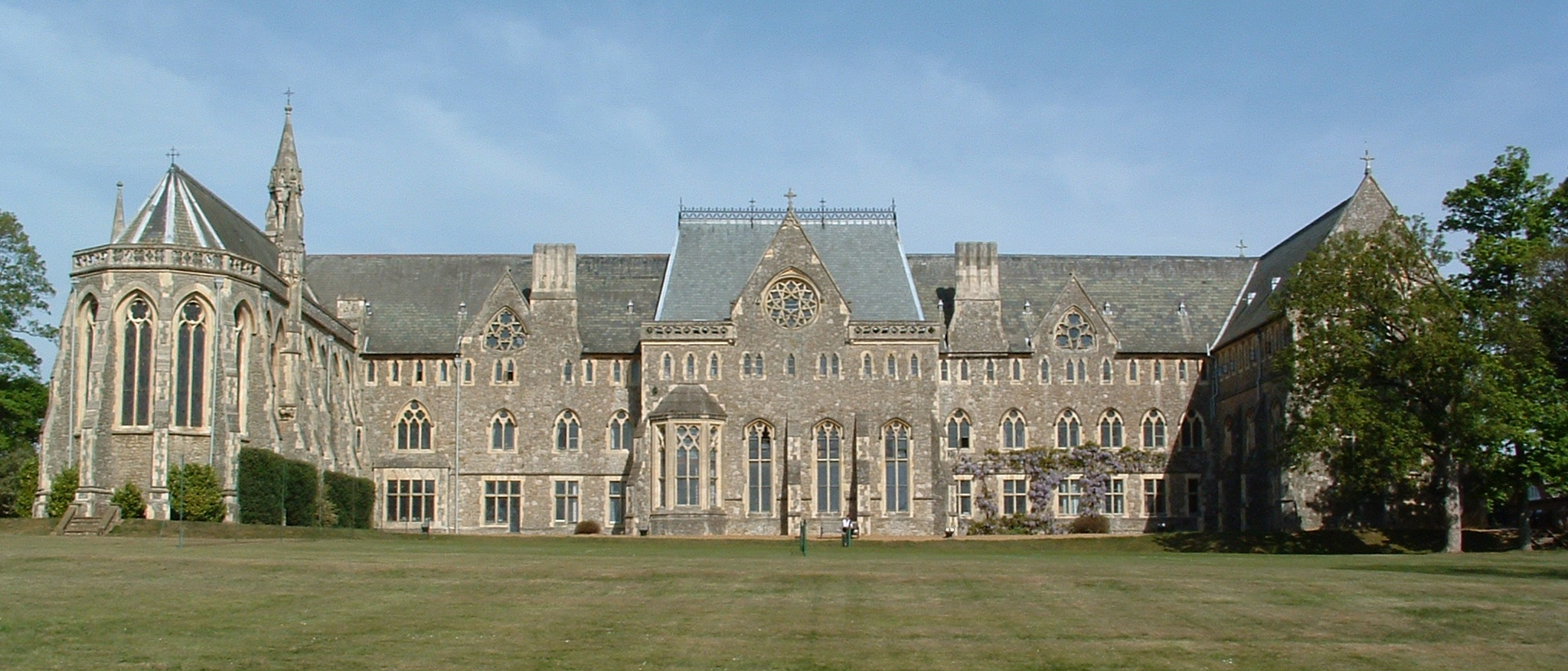
St. Edmund's School facade

In 1855, the school moved to Canterbury. The acquisition of property and financing to build the school was provided by Samuel Wilson Warneford. The main school building was designed by Philip Charles Hardwick, architect of Charterhouse School and Adare Manor. The chapel wing of the school was completed in 1858 and remains in daily use.

The choristers of Canterbury Cathedral began their education at the school in 1972. Grant house was established from the former Big School. After 20 years the school reverted to the traditional 4-house system.

In 1982, girls were admitted to the school for the first time.

In 2016 the school was fined £18,000 and ordered to pay costs of £9,670, after a seven-year-old child nearly drowned at the Summerfest event held at the school. The school did not ensure the lifeguards held the relevant qualifications and it could not be sure the guards had any experience or competency.

The Archbishop of Canterbury is the school’s patron.

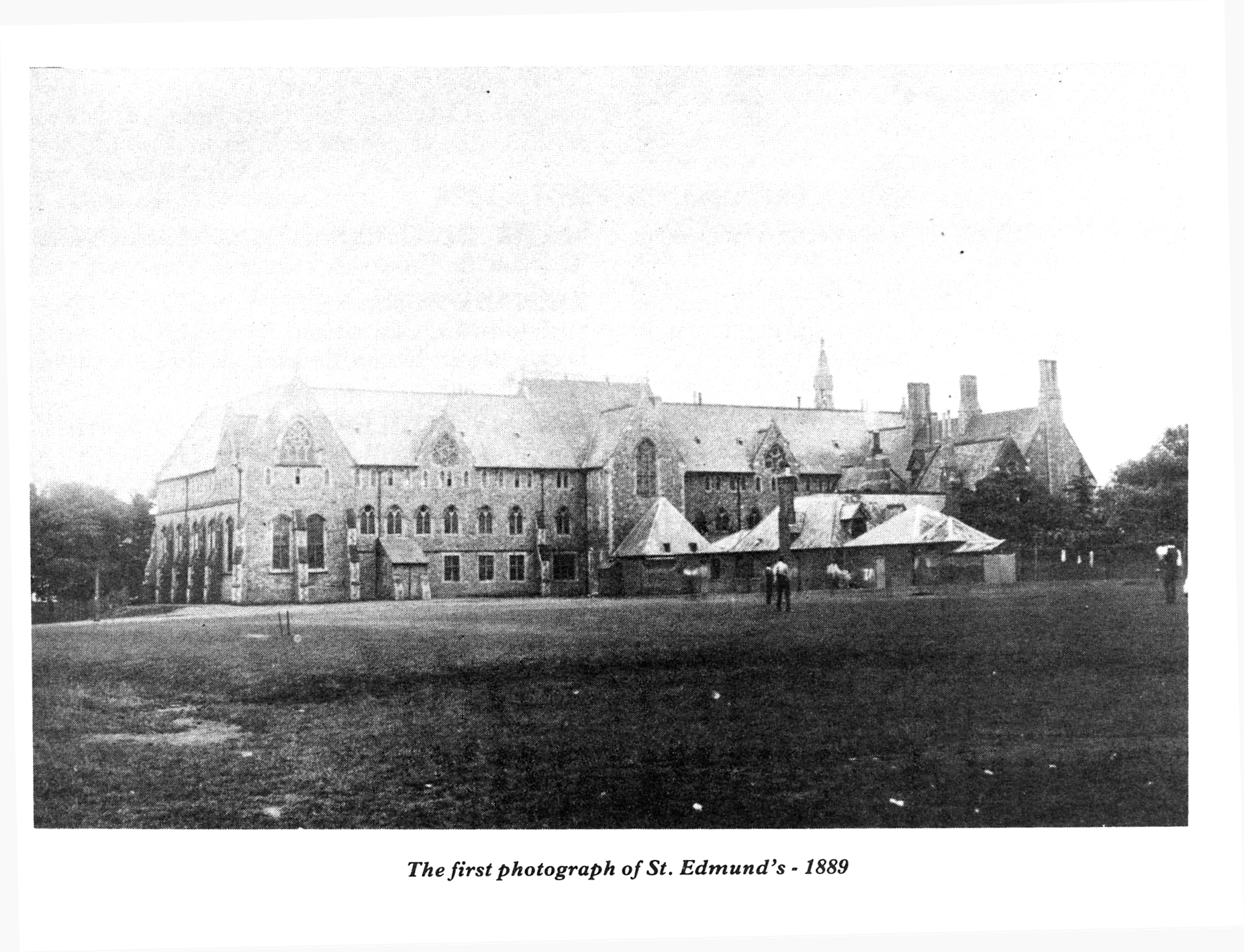
1st photo of the School 1889

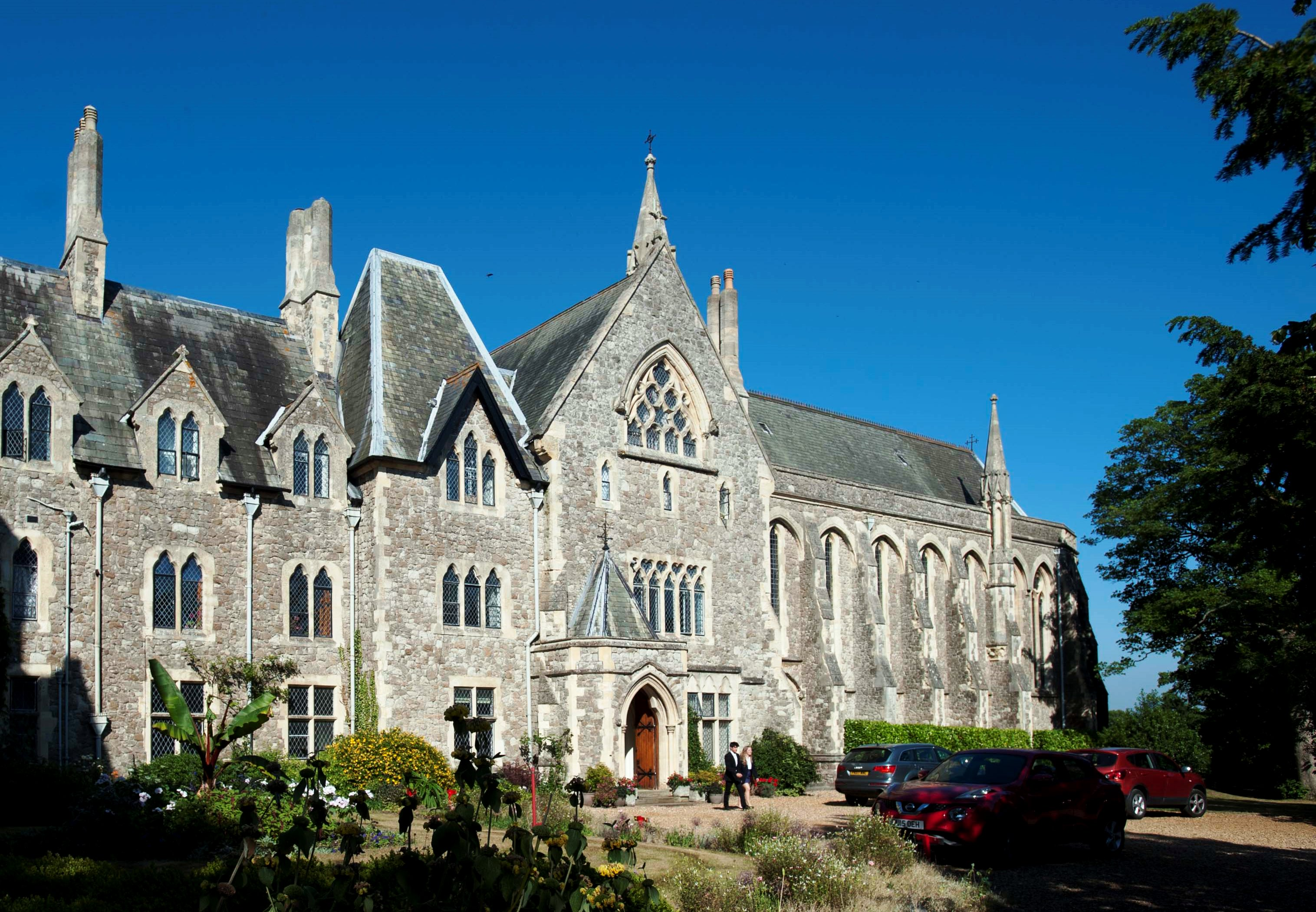
Main entrance

== Houses ==
The Senior School is divided into four day houses:

Name	Named After
Baker	Baker. A Victorian benefactor of the school
Wagner	Wagner. A Victorian benefactor of the school
Warneford	Dr. Samuel Warneford. A Victorian benefactor of the school, who donated the site and the building of the current location in Canterbury.
Watson	Watson. A Victorian benefactor of the school

In Junior School there are four houses:

Name	Named After
Becket	Thomas Becket
Chaucer	Geoffrey Chaucer
Marlowe	Christopher Marlowe
Roper	William Roper

The boarding houses:

Name	Named After
Owen (Senior School)	Owen. A benefactor of the school
School House (Junior School)	N/A

== Heads ==
- The name of the first Headmaster, between the years 1751 and 1762, is unknown.
- The Revd Daniel Addison (1762–1783)
- The Revd Daniel Addison (1783–1804)
- The Revd Thomas Cripps (1804–1805)
- The Revd Evan Jones (1805–1813)
- The Revd William Farley (1813–1816)
- The Revd Thomas Wharton (1817–1837)
- The Revd George Bewsher (1837–1841)
- The Revd. Daniel Butler (1841–1867)
- The Revd Charles Matheson (1867–1891)
- The Revd Arthur W. Upcott (1891–1902)
- The Revd Edward J.W. Houghton (1902–1908)
- The Revd Walter F. Burnside (1908–1932)
- The Revd Henry Balmforth (1932–1941)
- The Revd Frederick F.S. Williams (1942–1945)
- William M. Thoseby (1945–1959)
- Walter Stephen Jones (1 term 1959)
- B. Michael S.Hoban (1960–1964)
- Francis R. Rawes (1964–1978)
- John V. Tyson (1978–1994)
- A. Nicholas Ridley (1994–2005)
- Jeremy M. Gladwin (2005–2011)
- Louise J. Moelwyn-Hughes (2011–2018)
- Edward O'Connor (2018 – )

== Reviews ==
The Good Schools Guide note that after the school's rebranding it was no longer marketing itself as a music and drama school, nor did it continue to describe itself as "non-selective".

The Independent Schools Inspectorate reported in 2015 that the school met all the requirements of the Education (Independent School Standards) Regulations.

== Notable former pupils ==
- Willoughby Allen, Priest
- Francis Bacon, Cricketer and cricket administrator
- Jon Baddeley, Auctioneer
- Orlando Bloom, Actor
- Dan Caplen, Musician
- Maggie Cheung, Hong Kong & International Actress
- Thomas Crick, Anglican priest
- Lawrence Durrell, Novelist
- Benjamin Handley Geary VC, Victoria Cross Recipient
- Hope Gill, Anglican bishop
- Michael Goodliffe, Actor
- Sanjeev Gupta, Industrialist
- Darren Henley, Chief Executive of Arts Council England
- Bernard Howlett, Soldier
- Geoffrey Iliff, Anglican bishop
- Robin Jackman, Cricketer
- Ben Kemp, Cricketer
- Kenneth Hagar Kemp, soldier, cricketer, lawyer, etc
- Freddy Kempf, Pianist
- John Long, Priest
- Arthur Lovekin, Journalist and politician
- Nigel MacArthur, Broadcaster
- Percy MacKenzie, Cricketer and airman
- Sir Gordon MacMillan, British Army General
- Chris Nickols, Air Marshal
- Alan Payne, Cricketer
- John Peacey, Cricketer
- David Pettit, Cricketer
- John Pinsent, Classicist
- Adar Poonawalla, CEO Serum Institute of India
- Timothy Reynish, conductor and wind band director
- Roger Royle, Priest and broadcaster
- Adrian Snell, Musician and composer
- Hedley Sparks, Anglican priest and academic
- Max Spiers, Conspiracy theorist
- Mark Strudwick, British Army officer who served as General Officer Commanding Scotland
- Richard Totman (1949-2009), psychologist
- Stuart Townend, Athlete, soldier and schoolmaster
- Arthur Alban Wright, British colonial administrator
