= Journal for the Theory of Social Behaviour =

- Subject: Social behaviour
- Language: English
- Edited by: Alex Gillespie, Douglas Porpora

Publication details
- History: Since 1971
- Publisher: Wiley-Blackwell
- Frequency: Quarterly
- Impact factor: 1.6 (2024)

Standard abbreviations
- ISO 4: J. Theory Soc. Behav.

Indexing
- CODEN: JTSBBM
- ISSN: 0021-8308 (print); 1468-5914 (web)
- LCCN: 90640914
- OCLC no.: 754644871

Links
- Journal homepage; Online access; Online archive

The Journal for the Theory of Social Behaviour is a quarterly peer-reviewed academic journal covering the study of social behaviour. It was established in 1971 by Horace Romano Harré and Paul F. Secord to advance their alternative to the positivistic approach that was permeating much of social psychology at the time. It is published by Wiley-Blackwell and the editors-in-chief are Alex Gillespie (London School of Economics) and Douglas Porpora (Drexel University). According to the Journal Citation Reports, the journal has a 2024 impact factor of 1.6.
