= Fourth Reich =

Hypothetical successor of Nazi Germany

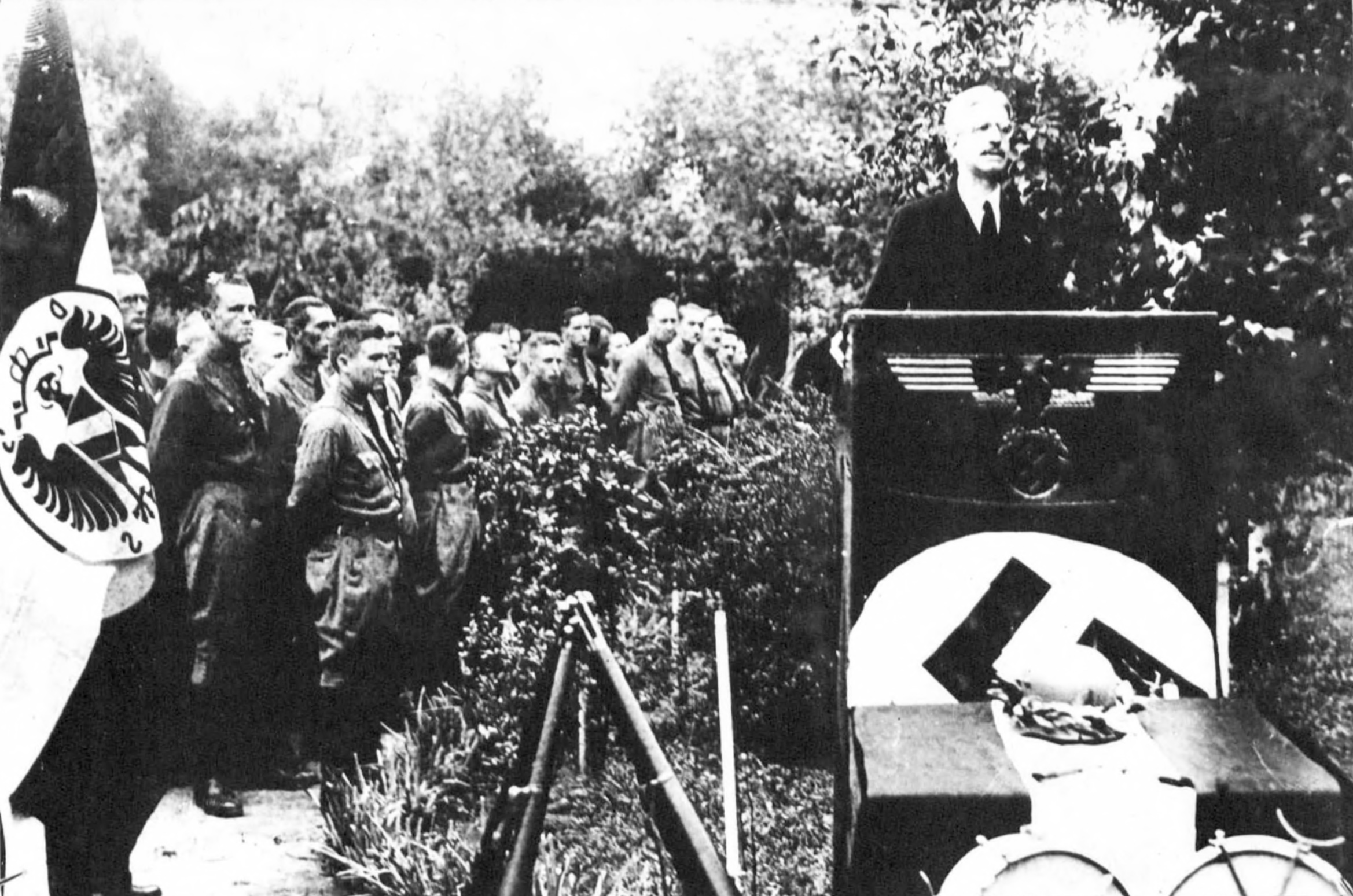
A gathering of militant Nazi émigrés in South America c. 1946, flanked by an unknown flag

The Fourth Reich (German: Viertes Reich) is the hypothetical successor to Nazi Germany, also known as the "Third Reich" (1933–1945). The term is used to describe the regime's possible survival (e.g. in South America) or its resurgence as envisioned by neo-Nazis.

The term has also been used pejoratively by leftist commentators in the United States to describe the rise of right-wing populism and by Eurosceptics to decry Germany's influence on the European Union.

== Origin ==
The term "Third Reich" was coined by Arthur Moeller van den Bruck in his 1923 book Das dritte Reich (Germany's Third Empire). He defined the Holy Roman Empire (962–1806) as the First Reich, the German Empire (1871–1918) as the Second Reich, while the Third Reich was a postulated ideal state including all German people, including Austria. The term was used by Nazi Germany to position their regime as a successor to these two empires.

The term "Fourth Reich" has been used in a variety of different ways. Neo-Nazis have used it to describe their envisioned revival of an ethnically pure state, especially Nazi Germany. Conspiracy theorists like Max Spiers, Peter Levenda, and Jim Marrs have used the term derogatorily to refer to what they perceive to be a covert continuation of Nazism.

Ironically, Jewish emigrants from Germany described their quarter in New York City — Washington Heights — as Fourth Reich.

== Neo-Nazism ==
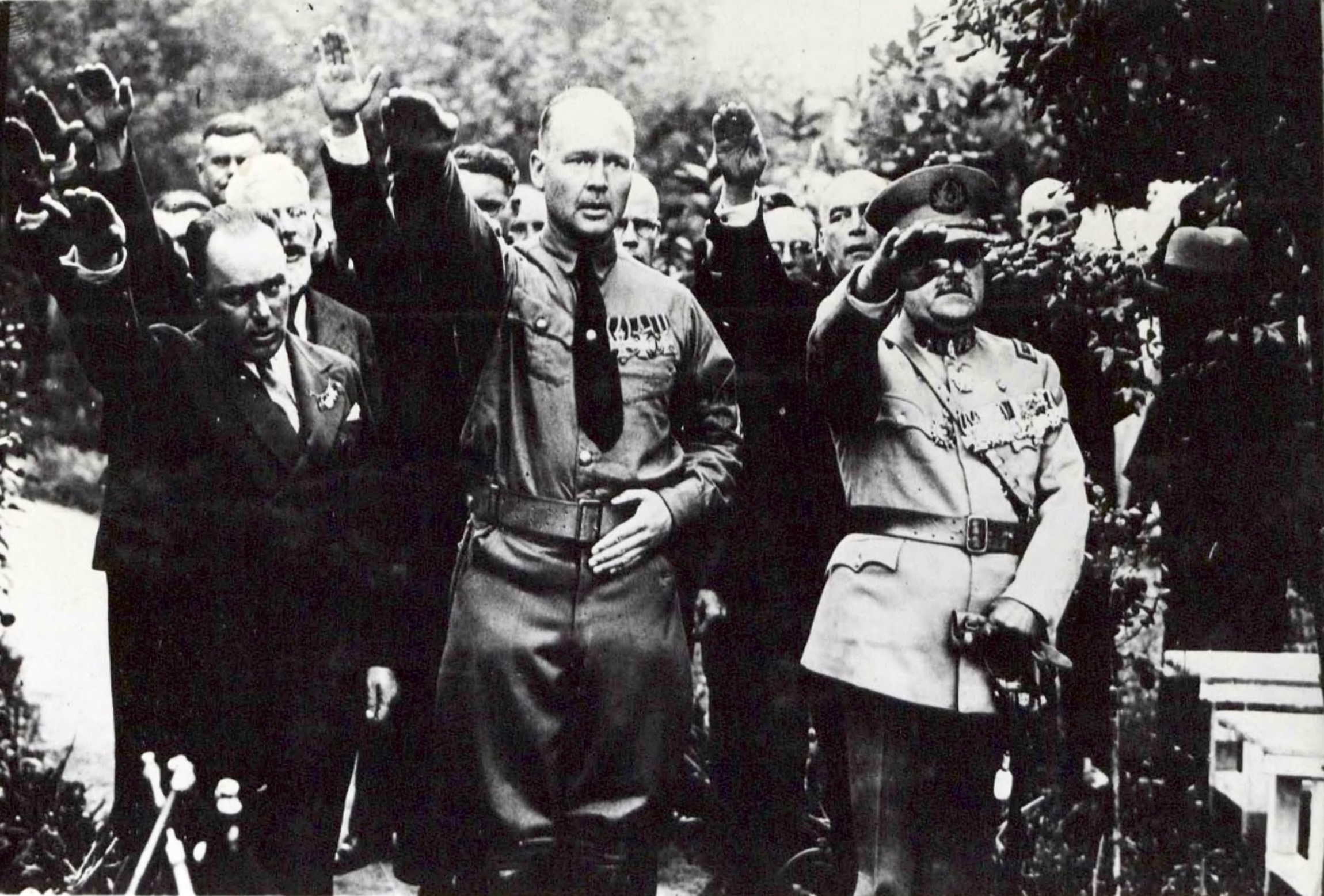
Nazi chieftain in South America, (Note: The central figure wears a very small toothbrush mustache and performs a Hitleresque salute.) photographed c. 1946 by Chile's probe

As many as 10,000 Nazis escaped to South America in the aftermath of World War II. Various neo-Nazis in South America aimed to establish a Fourth Reich, with former Nazi officer Otto Skorzeny facilitating the transfer of Nazi plunder to Argentina which helped Nazi sympathizer Juan Perón come into power, along with former Nazi Hans-Ulrich Rudel, the transport of other escapees. From about 1945 to 1947, Chile led an international probe (supported by the United States Federal Bureau of Investigation), which documented Nazi activity on the continent until 1947. In 2017, numerous files from the investigation were released to the National Archives of Chile, which History's investigative documentary series Hunting Hitler visited in 2018; the evidence was implied to support the existence of a Fourth Reich and possibly Adolf Hitler's secret escape from Berlin.

Neo-Nazis envision the Fourth Reich as featuring Aryan supremacy, antisemitism, Lebensraum, aggressive militarism and totalitarianism. Upon the establishment of the Fourth Reich, German neo-Nazis propose that Germany should acquire nuclear weapons and use the threat of their use as a form of nuclear blackmail to reexpand to Germany's former boundaries of 1937 and beyond. Based on pamphlets published by David Myatt in the early 1990s, many neo-Nazis came to believe that the rise of the Fourth Reich in Germany would pave the way for the establishment of the Western Imperium, a pan-Aryan empire encompassing all land populated by predominantly European-descended peoples (i.e., Europe, Russia, Anglo-America, Australia, New Zealand, and White South Africa).

== As a political pejorative ==
=== Right-wing populism ===
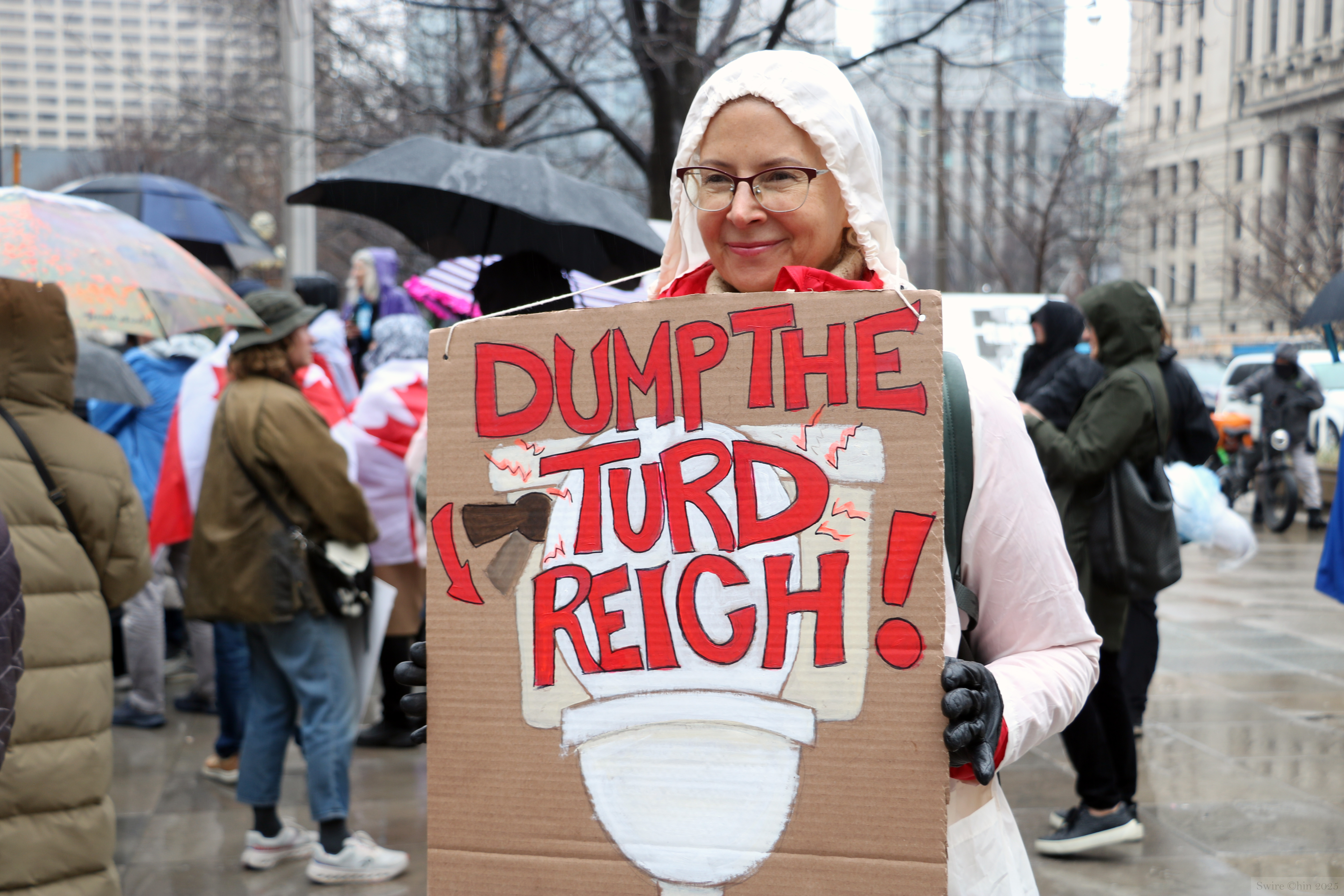
An anti-Donald Trump protester in 2025 with a sign reading "Dump the Turd Reich"

The term has come to be used by leftist commentators to compare the rise of right-wing populism to the emergence of fascism in Europe in the 1920s and 1930s. There is evidence of US Army and CIA collaboration with Nazis, like Reinhard Gehlen and Wernher von Braun. In a 1973 interview, African American writer James Baldwin said of Richard Nixon's reelection, "To keep the nigger in his place, they brought into office law and order, but I call it the Fourth Reich."

In 2019, Gavriel D. Rosenfeld, a professor of history at Fairfield University, argued that:

Too many hyperbolic comparisons – for example, between Donald Trump and Adolf Hitler – dulls the power of historical analogies and risks crying wolf. Too little willingness to see past dangers lurking in the present risks underestimating the latter and ignoring the former.

Prior to the 2024 US presidential election, a Trump administration employee posted, then deleted, a video on social media referencing a "unified Reich". Some commenters have argued that Trump's victory and subsequent administration marked a resurgence of Nazi ideals.

=== German influence in the European Union ===
Some commentators in Europe have used the term "Fourth Reich" to point at the influence that they believe Germany exerts within the European Union (EU). For example, Simon Heffer wrote in the Daily Mail that Germany's economic power, further boosted by the European financial crisis, is the "economic colonisation of Europe by stealth", whereby Berlin is using economic pressure rather than armies to "topple the leadership of a European nation". This, he says, constitutes the "rise of the Fourth Reich". Likewise, Simon Jenkins of The Guardian wrote that it is "a massive irony that old Europe's last gasp should be to seek ... German supremacy". According to Richard J. Evans of the New Statesman, this kind of language had not been heard since German reunification which sparked a wave of Germanophobic commentary. In a counterbalancing perspective, the "Charlemagne" columnist at The Economist reports that the German hegemony perspective does not match reality.

In August 2012, a headline in the Italian newspaper Il Giornale used the phrase Quarto Reich (Fourth Reich) to protest what it considered to be German hegemony. This hegemony perspective gained traction in the United Kingdom leading up to 2016 EU referendum and the subsequent Brexit negotiations. In December 2021, against the background of the Polish rule-of-law crisis, Jarosław Kaczyński, then- Deputy Prime Minister and head of Law and Justice, told the far-right Polish newspaper GPC that "Germany is trying to turn the EU into a federal 'German fourth Reich'". He asserted that he was only referring to the continuance from the Holy Roman Empire, not Nazi Germany. He criticized the vision of greater federalism, as displayed by Olaf Scholz and his coalition, as "utopian and therefore dangerous". Kaczynski remarked that, "if we Poles agreed to such a modern submission we would be degraded in many ways".

== References in popular culture ==
=== Film ===
- In the Finnish comedy science fiction film Iron Sky, some Nazis escaped to the far side of the Moon in 1945 and established the Fourth Reich.
- In the 1978 film adaption of The Boys from Brazil, Dr. Josef Mengele (Gregory Peck) creates clones of Hitler and places them around the world so they would eventually rise to political power and start the Fourth Reich.
- The 2009 French spy comedy movie OSS 117: Lost in Rio depicts OSS 117 (Jean Dujardin) fighting against Professor Von Zimmel, a Nazi established in Brazil, who wishes to create not a fourth, but a Fifth Reich.
- In the 2023 film Condor's Nest, after being reaccepted to work for the Nazi Party by Heinrich Himmler, Albert Vogel plans for a Fourth Reich by starting a nuclear war between the US and the Soviet Union.

=== Television ===
- In the 1967 episode of Mission: Impossible, "The Legacy", descendants of Adolf Hitler's most trusted Nazi officers meet in Zurich, Switzerland, to locate Hitler's hidden personal fortune in order to launch a new Fourth Reich.
- In the TV series Hunters, several Nazi leaders escaped to South America and plan to establish the Fourth Reich.

=== Novels ===
- The 1978 Robert Ludlum novel The Holcroft Covenant involves the discovery of a plot by hidden Nazis around the world to create a Fourth Reich by infiltrating many different businesses and countries' governments. His 1995 novel The Apocalypse Watch reaches its climax with the destruction of a Fourth Reich set in the 1990s, and the discovery of an ancient Adolf Hitler controlling a massive multinational corporation.
- In Ira Levin's 1976 novel The Boys from Brazil, Dr. Josef Mengele creates clones of Hitler and places them around the world so they would eventually rise to political power and start the Fourth Reich.
- In the Metro franchise, there is a faction within the Moscow Metro known as the Fourth Reich.

=== Tabletop Role-playing Games ===
- In Delta Green, the Karotechia is an occult Nazi organization hiding in South American that seeks to establish a Fourth Reich based on magic and serves as a recurring antagonist in the game's setting.

=== Video games ===
- In Call of Duty: Vanguard, the term "Fourth Reich" is used to describe a Nazi government-in-exile that the antagonists are forming.
- In the Hearts of Iron IV expansion Trial of Allegiance, an alternate history path for Argentina allows the player to create a Fourth Reich.
- In the Metro series, the Fourth Reich is an enemy faction depicted as the new Nazis Regime warring for power against the Red Line, the new Communist faction in the Metro tunnels. [Metro 2033 (novel)]

== See also ==
- Alternate history
- Eurabia – Far-right Islamophobic conspiracy theory
- Europe a Nation – Ideology developed by Oswald Mosley
- Fifth International – Campaign for a new worker's international
- Hypothetical Axis victory in World War II – Alternate history scenario
- Neo-Nazism in Russia
- Neo-Sovietism – Movement to revive Soviet ideologies
- Pan-European identity – Personal identification with Europe
- Pan-European nationalism – Far-right ultra-nationalism
- Pan-nationalism – Nationalism beyond national boundaries
- Reichsbürger movement – German far-right anti-government movement
- Third Rome – Claim to be successor to the Roman Empire
- United States of Europe – Speculative future European federation
- White ethnostate – State whose citizenry is limited to White people
- White nationalism – Ideology that seeks to develop a white national identity
