= Ben Kemp =

English cricketer (born 1993)

Benedict Kemp
Personal information
- Full name: Benedict William Kemp
- Born: 26 May 1993 (age 33); Canterbury, Kent, England
- Batting: Right-handed
- Bowling: Right-arm fast-medium
- Relatives: Nick Kemp (father)

Domestic team information
- Years: Team
- 2012–2013: Oxford MCCU

Career statistics
Competition	First-class
Matches	3
Runs scored	23
Batting average	7.66
100s/50s	0/0
Top score	11
Balls bowled	516
Wickets	7
Bowling average	42.14
5 wickets in innings	0
10 wickets in match	0
Best bowling	3/31
Catches/stumpings	2/–
- Source: Cricinfo, 16 July 2020

Benedict 'Ben' William Kemp (born 26 May 1993) is an English former first-class cricketer.

The son of the cricketer Nick Kemp, he was born at Canterbury and was educated at St Edmund's School Canterbury, before going up to Oxford Brookes University. While studying at Oxford Brookes, he made three appearances in first-class cricket for Oxford MCCU against Worcestershire in 2012 and Warwickshire and Worcestershire in 2013. (Note: Oxford MCCU differed from Oxford University Cricket Club in that it was open to students at Oxford Brookes University, whereas Oxford University Cricket Club is exclusively for students of the constituent colleges of the University of Oxford.) He scored 23 runs in his three matches, with a high score of 11. With his right-arm fast-medium bowling, he took 7 wickets at an average of 42.14 and best figures of 3 for 31.
