= Francis Bacon (cricketer) =

English cricketer

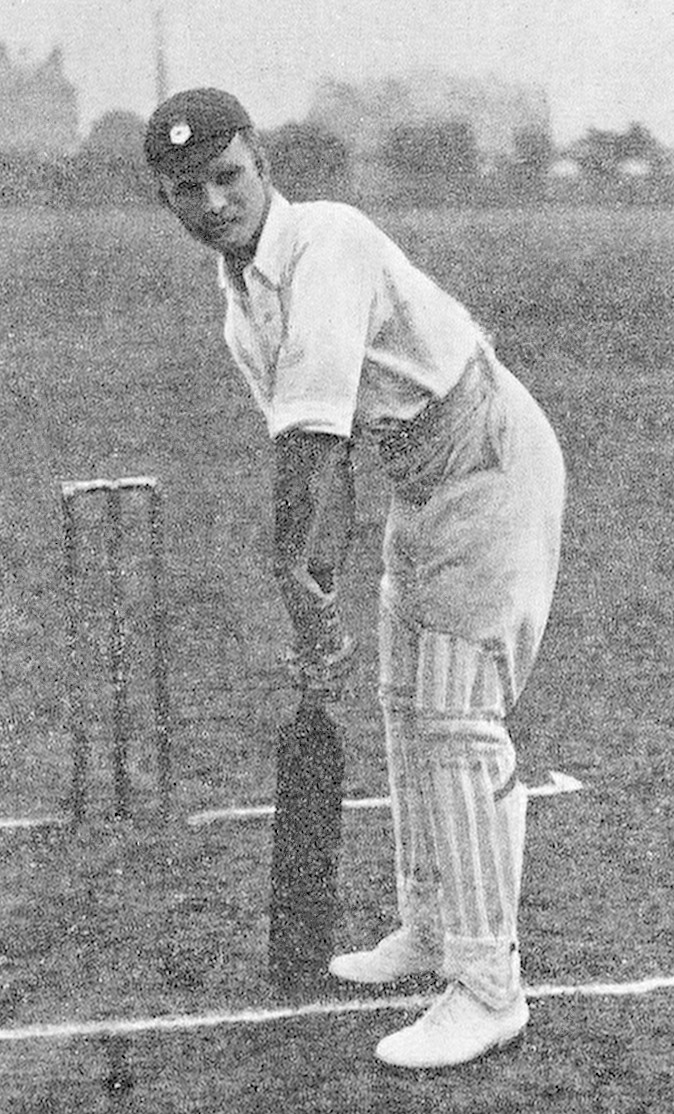
- Francis Bacon in 1896

Personal information
- Full name: Francis Hugh Bacon
- Born: 24 June 1869; Colombo, British Ceylon
- Died: 31 October 1915 (aged 46); English Channel
- Height: 5 ft 5 in (1.65 m)
- Batting: Right-handed
- Bowling: Right-arm slow

Domestic team information
- Years: Team
- 1895–1911: Hampshire

Career statistics
Competition	First-class
Matches	75
Runs scored	1,909
Batting average	15.77
100s/50s	1/5
Top score	110
Balls bowled	217
Wickets	6
Bowling average	31.66
5 wickets in innings	–
10 wickets in match	–
Best bowling	2/23
Catches/stumpings	34/–
- Source: Cricinfo, 17 February 2010

Francis Hugh Bacon (24 June 1869 – 31 October 1915) was an English first-class cricketer and cricket administrator. Bacon played first-class cricket for Hampshire on 75 occasions between 1895 and 1911, in addition to serving as Hampshire's first paid secretary from 1903 until his death while serving with the Royal Navy Reserve during the First World War.

== Life and cricket career ==
The son of The Reverend James Bacon, he was born in British Ceylon at Colombo. He was educated in England at the Clergy Orphan School, Canterbury. After completing his education, Bacon settled in Basingstoke where he worked as the manager of the Victoria Brewery. There he played club cricket for Basingstoke Cricket Club. Following three scores in a row of 101 not out for the club, he came to the attention of Hampshire County Cricket Club in 1894 and was invited to trial, scoring 113 that year in a minor match against Warwickshire. The following season, he made his debut in first-class cricket for the county against Somerset at Taunton in the 1895 County Championship; this was Hampshire's first match with first-class status since regaining the status that they had lost in 1885 and regained in 1894. He made scores of 11 and 92 in the match, the latter score being key in leading Hampshire to an 11 runs victory on their first-class return. Bacon played first-class cricket for Hampshire until 1911, making 75 appearances. In these, he scored 1,909 runs at an average of 15.77; he made one century, a score of 110 against Leicestershire. In terms of runs, his most successful season as a batsman was in 1903, when he scored 357 runs, while his best season average came in 1906, when he averaged 23.69. He was described as a free-hitting batsman and was considered the best cover-point fielder in England.

Bacon was appointed Hampshire's first paid secretary in 1903, at which point he reverted from being a professional cricketer to an amateur. He played an important role in improving the fixture list for Hampshire, in addition to recruiting professionals who formed the nucleus of the Hampshire side in the coming decades. In addition to playing and his role as an administrator, he was also a scorer in first-class matches between 1911 and 1914. At the start of the First World War, he suggested forming a corps made of professional cricketers, whom he considered epitomised the values of courage and honour. Bacon served in the war with the Royal Naval Reserve, holding the rank of assistant-paymaster. While serving on board Royal Yacht Squadron steam yacht HMS Aries on an auxiliary patrol near the South Goodwin Lightship on 31 October 1915, Aries struck a mine laid by the German submarine UC-6 while attempting to assist another ship. The mine broke Aries in two, resulting in it sinking within one minute with the loss of 22 souls, including Bacon. His body drifted subsequently across the North Sea and eventually washed up on the Danish coast, with him being buried in the churchyard at Börsmose.
