= Jill Ellison =

British nursing administrator (born 1955)

Dame Jill Ellison, DBE (born 31 January 1955) is Director of Nursing, Heart of England NHS Foundation Trust. She was educated at St Margaret's School, Bushey and now heads the Nurse Directors Association (NDA/UK).

The NDA is an independent organisation with membership open to all Nurse Directors and Senior Nurses working in NHS organisations, and equivalent posts in the Armed Forces, private sector, voluntary and charitable organisations throughout Great Britain (see NDA/UK website). The NDA's predecessor, Trust Nurses Association (TNA) was a voluntary network, established to provide peer support in the early 1990s, when National Health Service Trusts were first set up. The TNA was succeeded by the NDA in May 2002.
