= Alan Payne =

English cricketer (1903–1977)

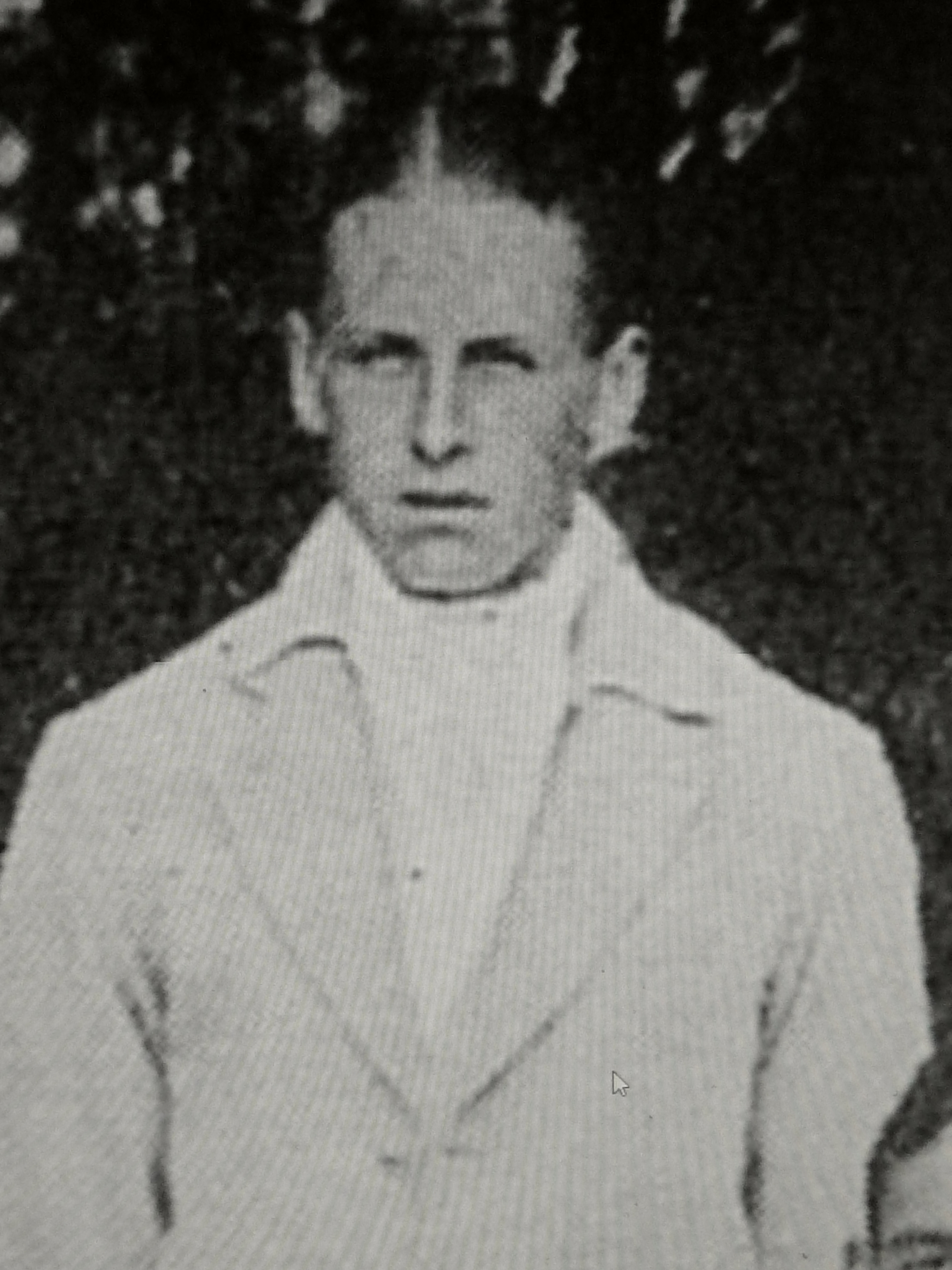

Personal information
- Full name: Alan Undy Payne
- Born: 28 January 1903; Witney, Oxfordshire, England
- Died: 16 August 1977 (aged 74); Braintree, Essex, England
- Batting: Right-handed
- Bowling: Right-arm medium-fast

Domestic team information
- Years: Team
- 1923–1929: Buckinghamshire
- 1925: Cambridge University

Career statistics
Competition	First-class
Matches	7
Runs scored	86
Batting average	10.75
100s/50s	0/0
Top score	27*
Balls bowled	96
Wickets	1
Bowling average	36.00
5 wickets in innings	0
10 wickets in match	0
Best bowling	1/36
Catches/stumpings	2/–
- Source: Cricinfo, 14 May 2011

Alan Undy Payne (28 January 1903 – 16 August 1977) was an English cricketer. Payne was a right-handed batsman who bowled right-arm medium pace. He was born in Witney, Oxfordshire and educated at St Edmund's School, Canterbury and Jesus College, Cambridge.

Payne made his first-class debut for Cambridge University against Leicestershire in 1925. During the course of the 1925 season, he played a further six first-class matches, the last coming against Oxford University. His awarding of a Cambridge Blue at the end of that season proved controversial and was widely criticised. His batting average that season was just 10.75, with a high score of 27*, while his bowling had yielded just one wicket. He was preferred to two batsmen on the team, one a previous blue and both established county players. His captain, Tris Bennett, explained that Payne was "the equal of any fieldsman in England" and was worth his place in the team for his fielding alone.

Payne was a Minor counties cricketer for Buckinghamshire, who he debuted for in the 1923 Minor Counties Championship against Bedfordshire. He played Minor counties cricket for Buckinghamshire from 1923 to 1929, making 37 appearances.

He later became a master at his old school, St Edmund's School, before undertaking the same role at Felsted School. Outside of cricket, he played field hockey to a high standard.

His wife, Muriel Irene Payne, died on 19 September 1945, aged 43. Payne died in hospital in Braintree, Essex on 16 August 1977.
