= David Pettit =

English cricketer and clergyman

Personal information
- Full name: David William Pettit
- Born: 24 March 1937; Canterbury, Kent, England
- Died: 28 May 1990 (aged 53); Greta West, Victoria, Australia
- Batting: Right-handed
- Bowling: Right-arm fast-medium

Domestic team information
- Years: Team
- 1958–1959: Oxford University

Career statistics
Competition	First-class
Matches	5
Runs scored	33
Batting average	11.00
100s/50s	0/0
Top score	22
Balls bowled	570
Wickets	6
Bowling average	72.00
5 wickets in innings	0
10 wickets in match	0
Best bowling	2/51
Catches/stumpings	0/–
- Source: Cricinfo, 23 June 2020

David William Pettit (24 March 1937 – 28 May 1990) was an English first-class cricketer.

Pettit was born at Canterbury in March 1937, where he was educated at St Edmund's School. From St Edmund's he went up to Hertford College, Oxford. While studying at Oxford, he played first-class cricket for Oxford University in 1958 and 1959, making five appearances. His matches for Oxford were mostly trials, with Pettit handed his first trial match against Derbyshire due to the unavailability of J. A. Bailey and David Sayer, where he was employed as a new ball bowler. He was expensive and did not take a wicket and did not feature for Oxford until the following year, when he played four matches in a row, which included an appearance against the touring Indians. However, he only took 6 wickets in these matches at an expensive average of 62.00.

Pettit died suddenly in May 1990 in Australia at Greta West, Victoria.
