= Clergy Support Trust =

Charity in the UK and Ireland

- Governors of the Charity for Relief of the Poor Widows and Children of Clergymen
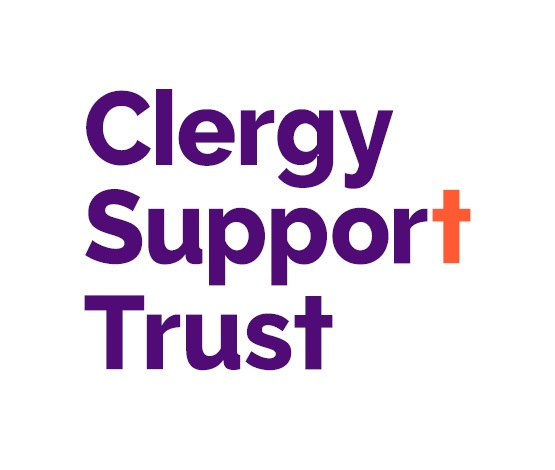
- Formation: 1655; 371 years ago
- Type: Charity
- Registration no.: 207736 (England & Wales)
- Headquarters: 1 Dean Trench Street, London
- Sen. Treasurer: Richard Farmbrough
- Treasurer: The Rev. Nancy Goodrich
- Treasurer: Constance Chinhengo
- CEO: The Revd Ben Cahill-Nicholls
- Revenue: £4.6 million (2022)
- Expenses: £6.6 million (2022)
- Employees: 20–25
- Website: https://www.clergysupport.org.uk/

Clergy Support Trust is a charity which provides support to Anglican clergy (serving and retired), ordinands, curates, and their families, in the UK, Ireland, Diocese in Europe and Diocese of Sodor and Man. In 2022, they supported over 2,300 clergy households.

The charity exists to provide financial and wellbeing support to serving and retired clergy of the Anglican Communion. The trust is, however, independent of the church, their services are confidential and they are completely impartial.

The trust supports Anglican clergy in the Church of England, the Diocese in Europe, the Scottish Episcopal Church, the Church in Wales and the Church of Ireland.

It was formerly known as Sons & Friends of the Clergy. The full official name of the charity is Governors of the Charity for Relief of the Poor Widows and Children of Clergymen.

== Foundation ==
The Corporation of the Sons of the Clergy was established in 1655 in response to the distress of the large number of clergymen who were dispossessed of their livings under the regime of Oliver Cromwell.

One of the main instigators of the charity was Edward Wake, who was uncle of William Wake, Archbishop of Canterbury. The founders were merchants of the City of London and priests of the Church of England, all of whom were themselves sons of clergymen. The first fundraising events were on 8 November 1655, when a Festival Service was held in Old St Paul's Cathedral, followed by a dinner in the Merchant Taylors' Hall. Collections were taken at each and these events have continued ever since. In 2024, the Trust marks the 369th Festival Service.

== Royal charter, and Sons of the Clergy ==
In 1678, King Charles II granted the charity a royal charter. This charter committed the administration of the “Charity for Releefe of the poore Widdowes and Children of Clergymen” to a “Court of Assistants”. The court of assistants consisted of a president, a vice-president, three treasurers and up to forty-two assistants, elected each year from the governors.

The court first met on 15 July 1678 in the Jerusalem Chamber at Westminster Abbey. The corporation's president was John Dolben, Bishop of Rochester and Dean of Westminster, whilst the Vice-President was Sir Christopher Wren.

A modernised version of the royal charter, based on the model articles of association for a charity in England and Wales, was approved by the governors of the charity in November 2019 and by the Queen (the charity's patron) through an Order in Council in February 2020. The court of assistants is elected at the charity's annual assembly (AGM) each year.

As time passed the corporation, maintaining its full name, but commonly operating under the shorter name "Sons of the Clergy", became a wider charity for clerical families and provided support such as the payment of the apprenticeship indentures. The charity obtained properties such as a house in Salisbury Square and other church land, and advowsons.

== Clergy Orphan Corporation ==
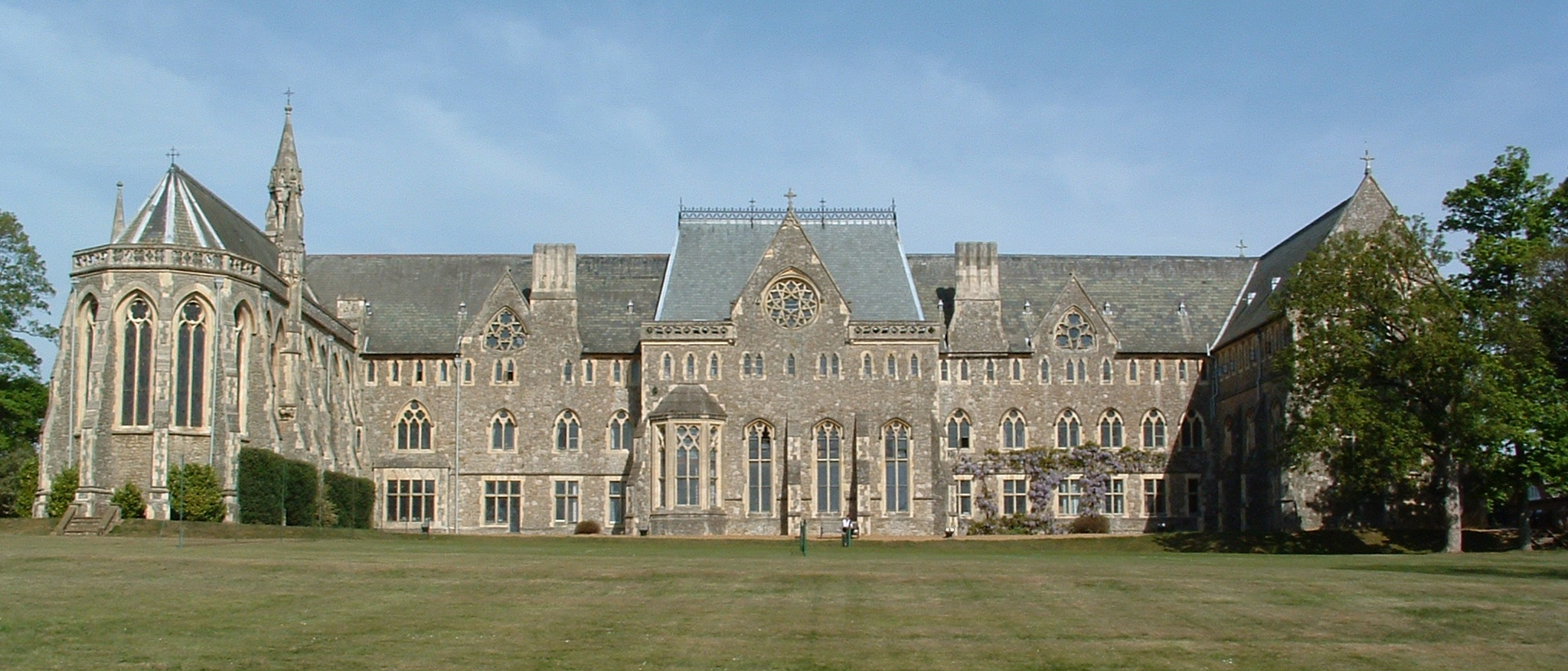
St Edmund's, the Clergy Orphan Corporation Boys' School

In 1749, a society formed for the purpose of founding both a boys' and girls' school for the maintenance and education of the orphans of Anglican clergyman in England and Wales.

This society was incorporated in 1809 as The Governors of the Society for Clothing, Maintaining, and Educating Poor Orphans of Clergymen of the Established Church in that part of the United Kingdom of Great Britain called England, until of Age to be put to Apprentice by the Clergy Orphan Corporation Act 1809 (49 Geo. 3 c. xviii) of 28 April 1809. Its common name was the Clergy Orphan Corporation.

Initially the boys were educated under a master in Thirsk in Yorkshire and the girls in a school-house in Chapel Street, Lisson Grove, Marylebone, London. The boys moved to Acton, London in 1805, and in 1812, both the girls and boys were moved to St John's Wood in London.

In 1852 Samuel Wilson Warneford, purchased a site for a new school in Canterbury and provided funds for the construction of a school and for scholarships. This led to the boys' school moving to Canterbury and the girls' school taking over the whole of the St John's Woods site. The boys' school was renamed St Edmund's in 1897. It is now an independent co-educational schools for boys and girls from 3 to 18.

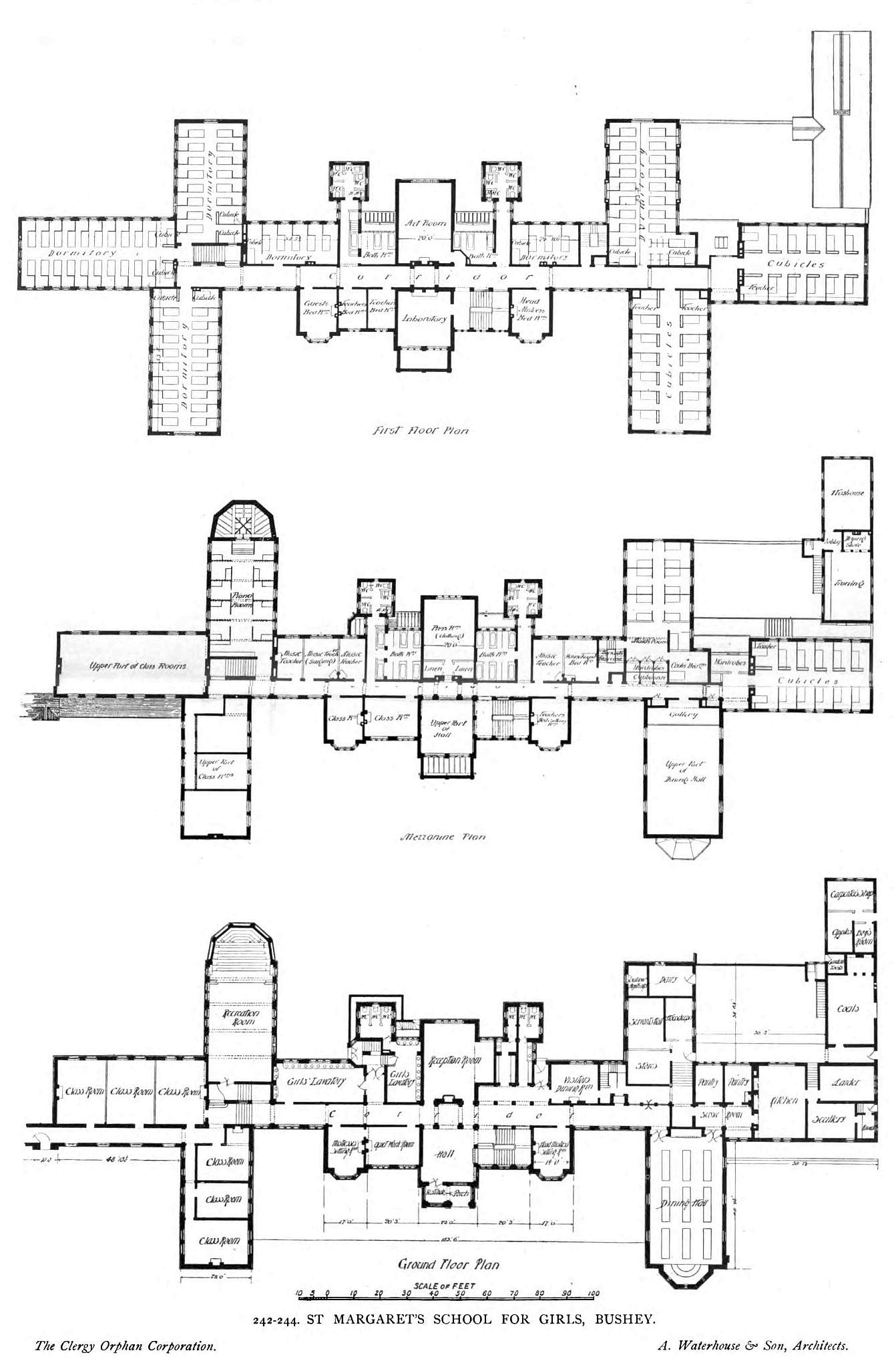
Floor plans for the girls' school at Bushey

The girls' school was compulsorily purchased by a railway company in 1895 and demolished. The girls, after a temporary stay in Windsor, moved to a purpose built school at St Merry Hill Road, Bushey, Hertfordshire, named for Saint Margaret of Scotland. It is now St Margaret's School, Bushey, an independent day and boarding school for girls.

The two schools, St Edmund's School Canterbury and St Margaret's School, Bushey were incorporated as limited companies and separate charities on 20 May 1996 and no longer formed part of the Clergy Orphan Corporation. The Clergy Orphan Corporation was fully incorporated into the Corporation of the Sons of the Clergy in 1997, via a statutory instrument, the Charities (Clergy Orphan Corporation) Order 1997 (SI 1997/2240).

=== Why the schools were needed ===
Farr's Life Table No. 3 shows that in the period 1838 to 1864, a man who reached the age of 25, the age at which many young clergymen would have completed their academic training and been ordained, had an roughly one in three chance of dying before he was 55. The risk of a clergyman of 25 dying by age 55 was about one in four in 1861–1871.

By contrast, the latest life table from the UK's Office of National Statistics, Life Table No. 17 based on data in 2010 – 2012 shows that the risk of man aged 25 dying before 55 was less than one in twenty. The significant risk in the 18th and 19th centuries, that a clerical family would lose the main breadwinner before all of the children were launched into the world led to the founding of the Clergy Orphan Schools.

== Friends of the Clergy ==
In 1820, another charity was established for the relief of poor clergymen and their families. Founded by Phyllis Peyton and the writer Mary Lamb, the "Clothing Society for the Benefit of Poor Pious Clergymen" grew rapidly, and following several changes of name (and amalgamations with smaller charities, culminating in the Friends of the Clergy Corporation Act 1972), became the Friends of the Clergy Corporation.

=== The extent of clerical poverty ===
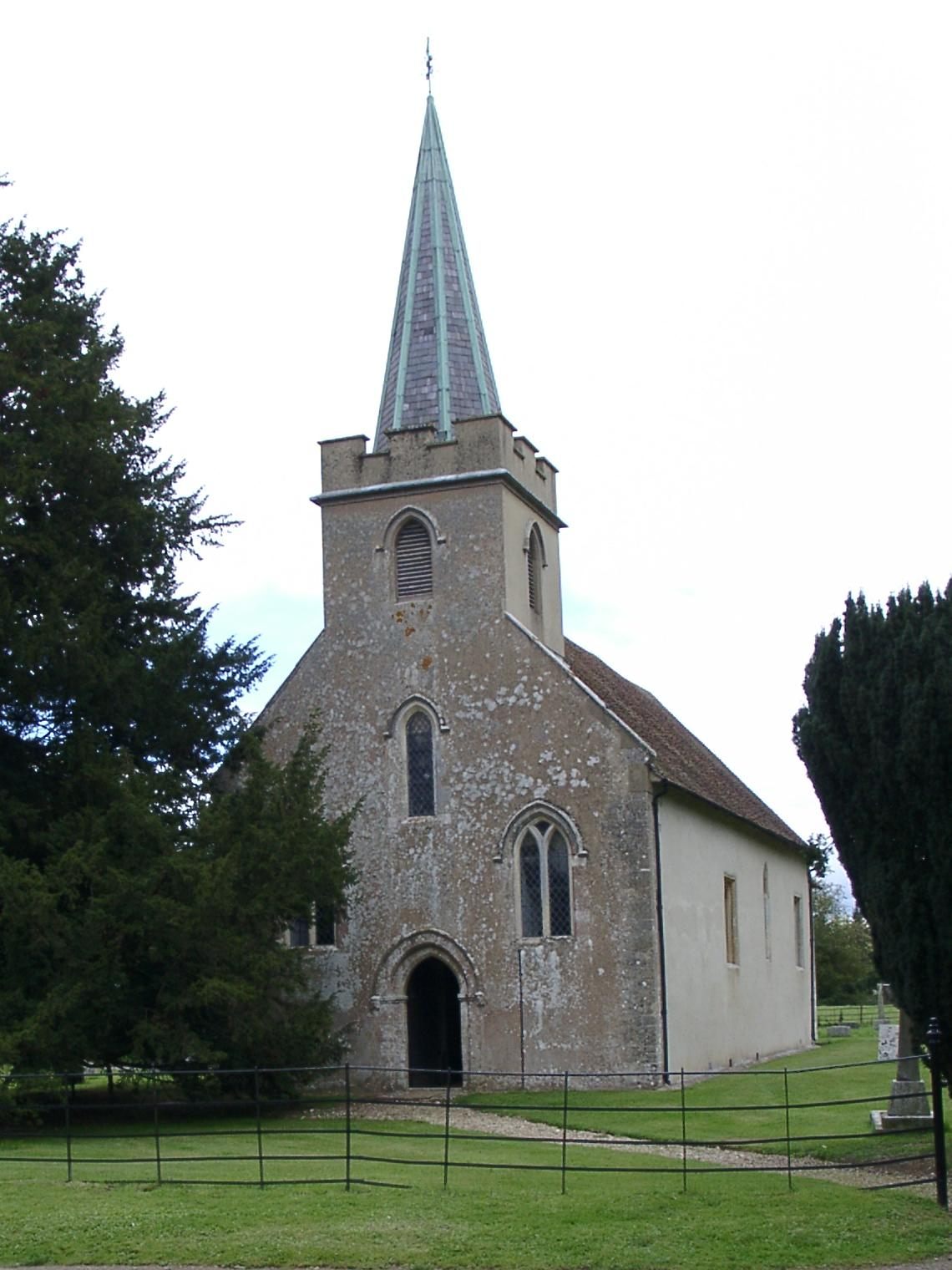
Austen's church at Steventon

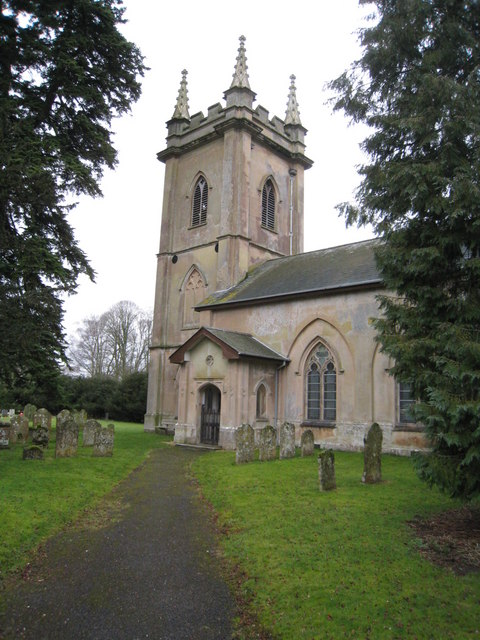
Austen's church at Deane

Only a fifth of the Anglican clergy active in 1839 had links to the gentry or peerage. Presumably, these had some inherited wealth. The others depended on what they could earn. About one quarter of the clergy were considered to be comfortably off, with at least £500 per annum in 1830. Ordained Church of England ministers had a number of potential sources of income:

- Direct employment as a curate, teacher, chaplain, or tutor. For example, Charles Kegan Paul, the founder of the publisher C. Kegan Paul, was employed as a tutor to pupils travelling to Germany for a year. He then appointed to a chaplaincy at Eton College and then to the new post of Master in College for which he was paid £120. He was allowed to supplement this by taking on two private pupils. Many clergy took private pupils as a way of supplementing their income.
- Benefices commonly called livings, most of which benefited from tithes and the glebe, but some of which were perpetual curates. About half of the 10,500 livings were in the gift of the local squire. The remaining half were controlled by the Crown, bishops, cathedral chapters, the universities of Oxford or Cambridge, and other institutions. In 1805, just over half (55%) of young clergymen could obtain such livings. A parliamentary inquiry in 1802 found that about 1,000 livings were worth less than £100 a year, and another 3,000 worth between £100 and £150. The picture was the same 30 years later and a tenth of beneficed clergymen received less than £100 a year. Of course, a clergyman might hold more than one living. This was known as pluralism. Jane Austen's clergyman father, George Austen, held two livings, at Steventon, Hampshire and at Deane, Hampshire. The Pluralities Act 1838 forbade clergymen having more than one benefice except under specific conditions. The desirable minimum income for a clergyman was thought to be £400, which was an upper middle-class income. Jervis reported that 6,750 parochial benefices were worth less than £300.

The poverty of many benefices
Value of Benefice	Number
<£50	294
£50 to <£100	1,621
£100 to <£150	1,591
£150 to <£200	1,325
£200 to <£300	1,964
Total	6,795

== Amalgamation of charities ==
During the 20th century, the Sons of the Clergy Corporation and the Friends of the Clergy Corporation found increasing opportunities to support each other's work and to cooperate.

In 2005, they committed to finding a route to permanent union, with widespread sharing of resources.

In 2006, they began a process of "common trusteeship" whereby the same people were appointed as Trustees of both charities.

In 2007, the two corporations moved into a single headquarters together, with a totally unified staff, remaining separate entities only in a legal and accountancy sense.

The process of formally amalgamating the two corporations was complex, but was completed in December 2012, when the Corporation of the Sons & Friends of the Clergy (or 'Sons & Friends of the Clergy") came into being.

In March 2019, the charity changed its working name to Clergy Support Trust, to reflect the fact that almost a third of those in ordained Anglican ministry are now women, and the 'Sons & Friends' name was off-putting to many female clergy.

== Charitable objects ==
The charity's objects, enshrined in its 1678 royal charter, as subsequently amended by Orders in Council in 1971, 2012, 2017 and 2020, are to support eligible beneficiaries in:

...the relief or prevention of poverty or hardship or for the relief of illness and the promotion of health, whether physical or mental

"Beneficiaries" are defined as follows:

...members of the clergy, ordinands and the spouses, former spouses, children and dependants of living or deceased members or former members of the clergy or of ordinands.

== Chatsworth Gardens ==
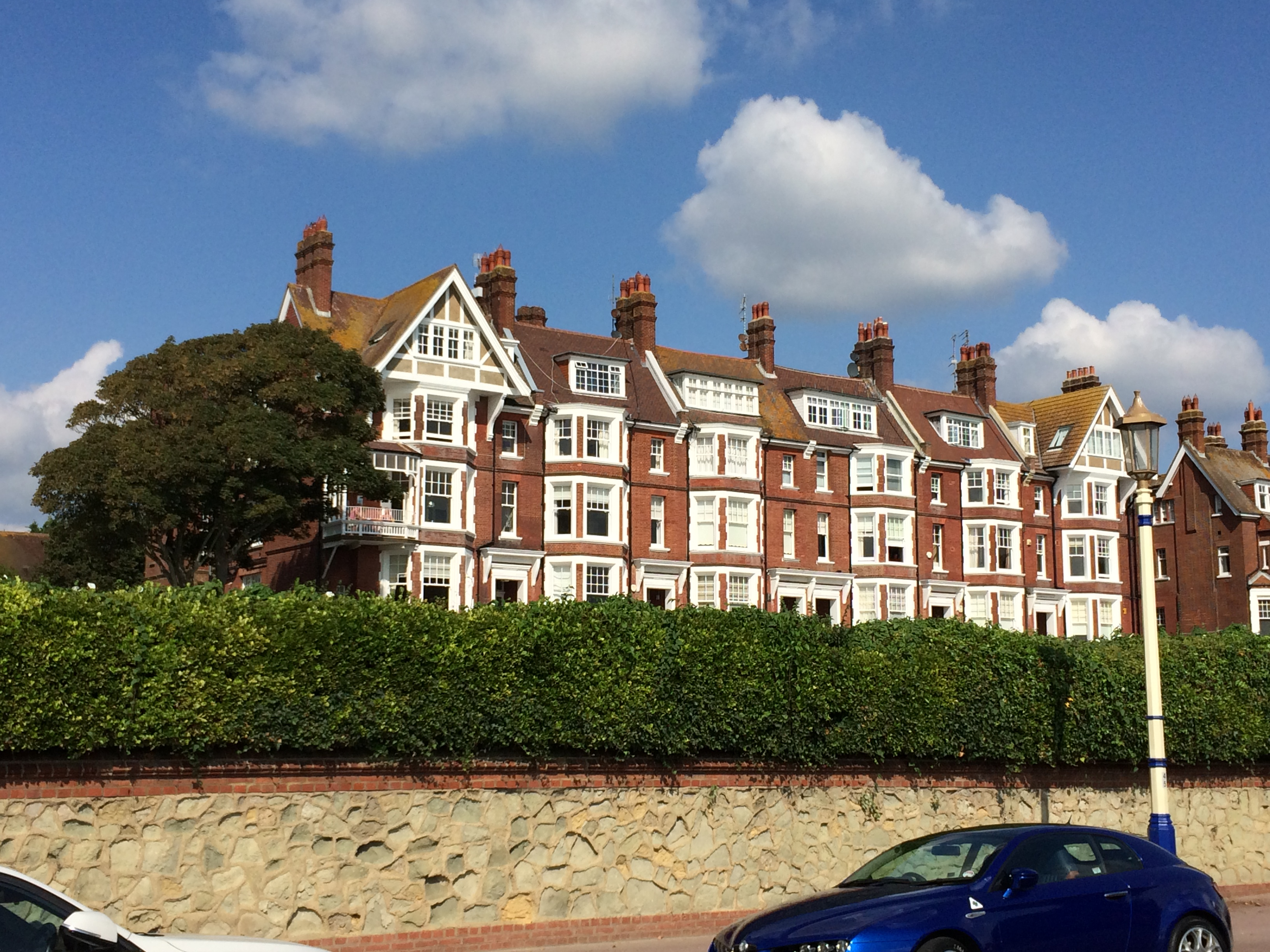
Chatsworth Gardens, Eastbourne, incorporating the former Clergy Holiday Homes of the Corporation of the Sons and Friends of the Clergy.

During the 1970s and 1980s, the charity maintained and operated Chatsworth Gardens in Eastbourne as a clergy holiday home. This large house, donated by the elderly owner during her lifetime, was converted into a series of apartments, and whilst the donor continued to live in one herself, the others were maintained by the charity as clergy holiday flats. Many clergy families of that era have common memories of the Eastbourne clergy holiday homes. Chatsworth Gardens was however an expensive asset, and was eventually sold.

== Modern operations ==
Today, Clergy Support Trust is the largest charity helping Anglican clergy and their families in times of hardship.

The charity is based in a Grade II listed building at 1 Dean Trench Street, Westminster, which address was for a while after WW1 the home of Winston Churchill.

== The Festival ==
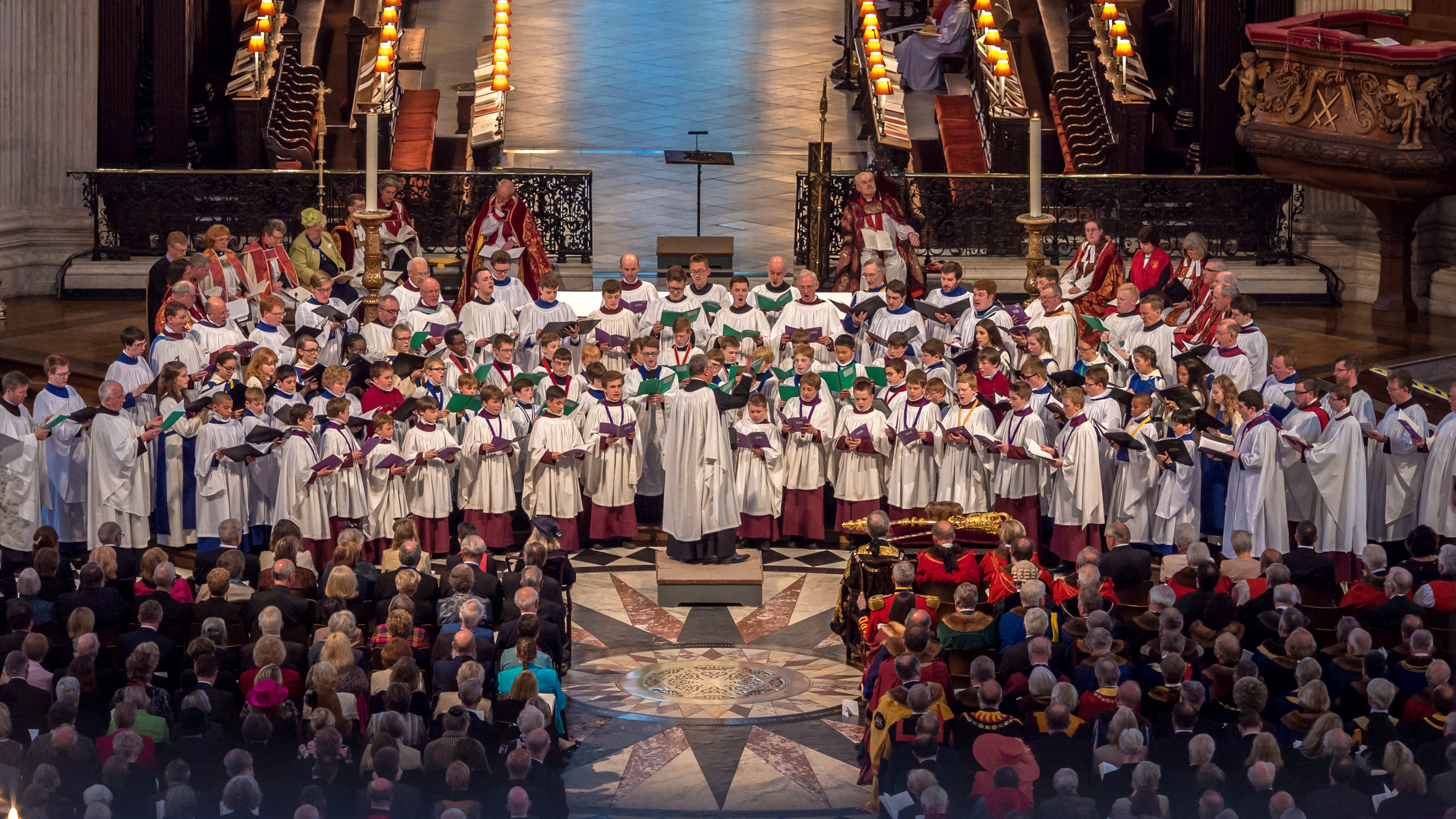
Combined choirs at the 2016 Sons & Friends Festival Service at St Paul's

The annual Festival service at St Paul's Cathedral, which began on 8 November 1655, has continued ever since, and is a major event annually in the calendar of the charity and of the cathedral. Senior clergy and City figures, including the Lord Mayor of London or their representative, are usually involved in the event, and in the life of the charity, with the Archbishop of Canterbury, Archbishop of York and Bishop of London serving as Presidents. With two cathedral choirs joining the choir of St Paul's, and with several composers such as Charles Villiers Stanford, Hubert Parry and Edward Elgar having written pieces for the event, the Festival is now one of the oldest and best known choral events in the Anglican Communion.

Festival cathedral choirs since 2000 (in addition to the Choir of St Paul's)

- 1980: Bradford and ...
- 1999: Lichfield and ...
- 2000: St Albans and the Temple Church Choir
- 2001: Carlisle and St George's Chapel, Windsor
- 2002: Chelmsford and Newcastle
- 2003: Ely and Hereford
- 2004: Various cathedral choirs (350th Festival)
- 2005: New College, Oxford, and York
- 2006: Derby and Winchester
- 2007: Guildford and Christ Church, Oxford
- 2008: Ripon and Truro
- 2009: Exeter and Salisbury
- 2010: Lincoln and Westminster
- 2011: Edinburgh and Worcester
- 2012: Bristol and Southwell
- 2013: Norwich and Tewkesbury Abbey
- 2014: Peterborough and Wakefield
- 2015: Manchester and Portsmouth
- 2016: Birmingham and St Edmundsbury
- 2017: Chester and Chichester
- 2018: Chelmsford and Gloucester
- 2019: Canterbury and Coventry
- 2020: Cancelled
- 2021: Online (due to the COVID-19 pandemic)
- 2022: Liverpool and Southwark
- 2023: Leicester and Llandaff
- 2024: Durham and Rochester
- 2025: Lichfield and Bradford

== Executive leadership ==
Register of the Corporation of the Sons of the Clergy

- 1678 to 1679: Henry Symonds
- 1679 to 1711: Thomas Tyllott
- 1711 to 1731: William Pocklington
- 1731 to 1741: Valens Comyn
- 1741 to 1759: Stephen Comyn (father of Stephen George Comyn, the naval chaplain to Lord Nelson)
- 1759 to 1788: Thomas Wall

Registrar of the Corporation of the Sons of the Clergy

- 1788 to 1803: John Topham
- 1803 to 1808: Henry Stebbing (son of the Revd Henry Stebbing, the English churchman and controversialist)
- 1808 to 1833: John Grimwood
- 1833 to 1848: Oliver Hargreave
- 1848 to 1878: Charles J Baker
- 1878 to 1919: Sir W Paget Bowman (son of Sir William Bowman, 1st Baronet, the famous surgeon)
- 1919 to 1936: Major Aldred C. Rowden (father of Diana Rowden, a WW2 heroine)
- 1936 to 1947: Eustace Baillie Reynolds
- 1947 to 1960: H Dennis Chignell
- 1960 to 1972: Brigadier Guy O N Thompson DSO OBE
- 1972 to 1981: Brigadier Ian M Christie
- 1983 to 2000: R Christopher F Leach MBE
- 2000 to 2012: Robert Welsford
- 2012 to 2012: Andrew Gray

Registrar of Sons & Friends of the Clergy and later Clergy Support Trust (Chief Executive from 2017)

- 2012 to 2015: The Rt Revd Graeme Knowles
- 2015 to 2017: Tim Jeffery (Interim)
- 2017 to 2020: Jeremy Moodey
- 2020 to the present: The Revd Ben Cahill-Nicholls

== Officers of the charity ==
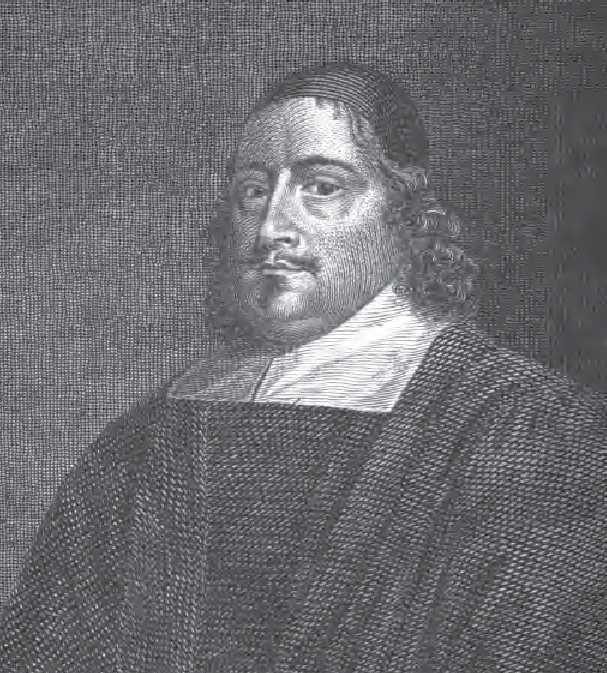
Archbishop John Dolben, first President of the charity following Incorporation by Royal Charter.

Presidents

- 1678 to 1683: John Dolben, Bishop of Rochester and Dean of Westminster
- 1683 to 1684: Peter Gunning, Bishop of Ely
- 1684 to 1690: Francis Turner, Bishop of Ely
- 1690 to 1697: William Lloyd, Bishop of St Asaph
- 1697 to 1716: Thomas Tenison, Archbishop of Canterbury

From 1716 to 2017 the post of President was always held ex officio by the Archbishop of Canterbury. In November 2017 Archbishop Justin Welby became Honorary President.

Vice Presidents (usually a senior judge)

- 1678 to 1683: Sir Christopher Wren (also held office from 1722 until his death in March 1723)
- 1689 to 1696: Sir William Gregory, judge and parliamentarian
- 1696 to 1705: Sir Thomas Meres MP (also held office from 1706 to 1707)
- 1705 to 1706: Sir Nathan Wright, Lord Keeper of the Great Seal
- 1723 to 1741: The Hon Sir John Verney, Master of the Rolls
- 1741 to 1761: Sir John Willes, Chief Justice of the Court of Common Pleas
- 1762 to 1778: Sir Sidney Smythe
- 1778 to 1806: Sir John Skynner, Chief Baron of the Exchequer
- 1806 to 1818: Lord Ellenborough, Lord Chief Justice
- 1818 to 1823: Sir Richard Richards, Lord Chief Baron of the Exchequer
- 1823 to 1829: Lord Tenterden, Lord Chief Justice of the King's Bench
- 1829 to 1846: Sir Nicholas Tindal, Chief Justice of the Court of Common Pleas
- 1846 to 1854: Lord Denman, Lord Chief Justice of England
- 1854 to 1868: Lord Cranworth, Lord High Chancellor of Great Britain
- 1868 to 1878: Lord Chelmsford, Lord Chancellor
- 1878 to 1880: Lord Hatherley, Lord Chancellor
- 1880 to 1891: Lord Powis, Conservative peer and great grandson of Clive of India
- 1891 to 1899: Lord Herschell, Lord Chancellor
- 1899 to 1909: Lord Egerton, Conservative peer
- 1909 to 1916: Lord Alverstone, initially Lord Chief Justice
- 1916 to 1938: Lord Parmoor, Liberal peer and politician
- 1938 to 1945: Lord Ancaster GCVO, Conservative politician
- 1945 to 1965: Sir Harry Vaisey, judge and expert on ecclesiastical law
- 1965 to 1981: Sir Denys Buckley, later Lord Justice of Appeal
- 1981 to 1996: Lord Templeman, Lord of Appeal in Ordinary
- 1996 to 2004: Lord Lloyd of Berwick, initially a Lord of Appeal in Ordinary
- 2004 to 2016: Sir John Chadwick, Lord Justice of Appeal from 1997 to 2007

Honorary Vice Presidents

- 2021 to present: Marsha De Corva MP, The Revd Lord Green of Hurstpierpoint, The Baroness Hale of Richmond DBE PC QC FBA, The Lord Lisvane KCB DL and The Rt Hon Theresa May MP.

== Incorporated bodies ==
Over the many years of history of this charity, its legal status has changed several times, and a large number of smaller charities have been incorporated into it by merger, amalgamation, or takeover. The following former clergy charities are all now incorporated into the current day Corporation of the Sons & Friends of the Clergy:

- Charity for Relief of the poor Widows and Children of Clergymen
- Clergy Orphan Corporation
- Clothing Society for the Benefit of Poor Pious Clergymen
- Corporation of the Sons of the Clergy
- Curates Augmentation Fund
- Friends of the Clergy Corporation
- Poor Clergy Relief Corporation
- Poor Parochial Clergy Society
- Society of Stewards and Subscribers for Maintaining and Educating Poor Orphans of Clergymen

== Sources ==
- Gentleman’s Magazine; March 1785
- Gentleman's Magazine; January 1817
- PEARCE, Ernest Harold The Sons of the Clergy, 1655-1904. London: John Murray, 1904 ISBN 1-3318-5121-1
- COX, Nicholas Bridging the Gap: A History of the Corporation of the Sons of the Clergy Over 300 Years, 1655-1978. Oxford: Becket Publications, 1978 ISBN 0-7289-0002-5.
- Ross Clark '"Poverty in the vicarage" Independent, The (London), Sep 14, 1998
