= Percy MacKenzie =

English cricketer (1918–1989)

Personal information
- Full name: Percy Alec MacKenzie
- Born: 5 October 1918; Canterbury, Kent, England
- Died: 1 January 1989 (aged 70); Rye, Sussex, England
- Batting: Right-handed
- Bowling: Leg break googly

Domestic team information
- Years: Team
- 1938–1939: Hampshire
- 1947–1948: Berkshire

Career statistics
| Competition | First-class |
|---|---|
| Matches | 22 |
| Runs scored | 652 |
| Batting average | 19.75 |
| 100s/50s | –/4 |
| Top score | 76 |
| Balls bowled | 874 |
| Wickets | 17 |
| Bowling average | 35.58 |
| 5 wickets in innings | – |
| 10 wickets in match | – |
| Best bowling | 4/34 |
| Catches/stumpings | 11/– |
- Source: Cricinfo, 19 February 2010

Percy Alec MacKenzie DSO DFC (5 October 1918 — 1 January 1989) was an English first-class cricketer and Royal Air Force officer. MacKenzie played county cricket for Hampshire for two seasons prior to the Second World War. During the war, he served in the Royal Air Force Volunteer Reserve and was decorated with both the Distinguished Flying Cross and the Distinguished Service Order.

== Early life and first-class cricket ==
MacKenzie was born at Canterbury in October 1918. He was educated at The Cathedral Choir School, Canterbury. While at the school, MacKenzie was coached by Felicity Hardcastle, a member of the Kent ladies' cricket team. MacKenzie was later taken onto the Kent County Cricket Club ground staff on the recommendation of Charles Marriott, who had seen him bowling leg spin on the St Lawrence Ground with a tennis ball. After the 1935 season, MacKenzie was not retained by Kent. He joined the Hampshire staff as a professional in 1938, and by May had qualified to represent them, making his debut in first-class cricket against Worcestershire at Basingstoke in the 1938 County Championship. After making three first-class appearances in 1938, MacKenzie made a further nineteen appearances in 1939. In 21 first-class matches for Hampshire, he scored 652 runs at an average of 19.75; he made four half centuries, with his highest score of 76 coming against Lancashire in 1939. With the ball, he took 17 wickets at a bowling average of 35.58, with best figures of 4 for 34.

== Second World War and later life ==
With the beginning of the Second World War in September 1939 and the subsequent suspension of cricket during war, MacKenzie's first-class career came to an abrupt end. He initially served in the Royal Air Force Volunteer Reserve (RAFVR) as a flight sergeant, before being made an emergency commission to the rank of pilot officer in January 1942. In May 1942, he was awarded the Distinguished Flying Cross, with his citation in the London Gazette reading:

Pilot Officer Mackenzie, who is in the RAFVR, has completed many sorties first as a navigator and later as captain against heavily defended targets which have included Hamburg, Kiel and Essen. On all occasions, often in very bad weather with intense enemy opposition, by his determined efforts and skilful airmanship he has located and bombed all his targets successfully.

He was promoted to the war substantive rank of flight lieutenant in November 1942. Whilst flying with No. 83 Squadron RAF in January 1943, he successfully piloted a damaged Lancaster bomber back to England following a raid over Berlin. For this action, Mackenzie became the first professional cricketer to be awarded the Distinguished Service Order (DSO) (those cricketers awarded the DSO in prior conflicts were regarded as amateurs). His DSO citation in the London Gazette read:

Since being awarded the DFC, Acting Flight Lieutenant Mackenzie has participated in numerous successful sorties. One night in Jan 1943 he piloted an aircraft detailed to attack Berlin. Whilst crossing the coast on his homeward flight his aircraft was subjected to heavy and accurate anti-aircraft fire. Two of his aircraft's engines were damaged and rendered unserviceable. Height was lost but, although faced with a 300-mile flight over the sea, Flight Lieutenant Mackenzie continued his homeward journey. When halfway across the water a third engine became overheated. The aircraft was now down to 600 feet and the situation appeared hopeless, but Flight Lieutenant Mackenzie, displaying grim determination, flew on at this height and eventually reached this country where he landed his damaged aircraft. By his high courage and superb skill, this officer was undoubtedly responsible for the safe return of his aircraft and its crew.

In July 1943, he was promoted to squadron leader, and having completed two operational tours, he was transferred to instructor duties.

== Post-war life ==
Following the war, MacKenzie did not return to professional cricket with Hampshire. He did however play minor counties cricket as a batsman for Berkshire in 1947 and 1948, making eleven appearances. He was slightly injured in April 1962, when his car was involved in a collision with a van at St George's Gate in Canterbury. After the war, he retained his connection to flying in a civilian capacity, and would later become a flight director with British Caledonian, retiring in 1985. During his time with British Caledonian, he was awarded the Queen's Commendation for Valuable Service in the Air in the 1978 New Year Honours. MacKenzie died on New Year's Day in 1989 at Rye.
