= Positioning theory =

Theory in social psychology

Positioning theory is a theory in social psychology that characterizes interactions between individuals. "Position" can be defined as an alterable collection of beliefs of an individual with regards to their rights, duties, and obligations. "Positioning" is the mechanism through which roles are assigned or denied, either to oneself or others. The theory describes malleable roles and storylines that determine the boundaries of future acts and the meanings of what people say and do. The theory expands upon the work of psychologist Lev Vygotsky, especially his theory of zone of proximal development (ZPD). It emphasizes the interdependence of positions, speech and other acts, and storylines that arise from them; a change in any one aspect affects the other two. The theory provides a framework to understand a person's specific behavior by considering social, individual, and moral factors.

There are three orders of positioning based on how positions are assumed: first-, second- and third-order positioning. Positioning can also be classified into various types depending on the specifics of the situation; these include self, other, tacit, intentional, interactive, reflexive, moral, personal, indirect, and malignant positioning. Positioning theory originated in the 1990s from Positioning: the discursive production of selves, which looked to solve a problem that arose "out of a discussion about the problems inherent in the use of the concept of role in developing a social psychology of selfhood". Since its inception, Positioning theory has been developed further with contributions from Bronwyn Davies, Rom Harré, Luk Van Langenhove, and Fathali Moghaddam. The theory has provided a structure for social discourse analysis, and it has been used to study various social situations. Its application has extended into fields such as education, anthropology, communication, and political science.

== Overview ==
Positioning theory provides a framework to comprehend why individuals choose to act with one specific behavior or a narrowed set of behaviors out of the many possible behaviors before them. "Positions" are a collection of specific beliefs that individuals have in context of rights, duties and obligations. They are open to change (compared to "roles" which are fixed) and constitute a basic foundation in helping an individual determine how to behave in a certain way. "Positioning" pertains to the mechanisms by which roles are assigned, appropriated or denied; it also involves the forms in which individuals build themselves and others through discursive activities, such as oral and written expression, usage of language, speech, and other actions based on normative and moral systems. The opportunities for people to act depend on numerous other people. In order to perform tasks, individuals use their own cognitive capabilities as well as the capabilities of others.

Researchers have studied the narratives used by individuals to position themselves and others. These studies specifically look at how positions are assumed by individuals (for themselves and others) based on their interpretation of "rights" (what a person is owed by others) and "duties" (what a person owes to others). The theory involves conventions of speech and action that are changeable, questionable, and short-lived. This is in contrast to role theory, in which roles are relatively fixed and static. The theory can be used to investigate how an individual constructs their story, and therein their sense of self, the social acts (including speech) represented in and through their story, and the positions that they reveal.

=== Relation to Lev Vygotsky's theories ===
In the second circle, representing the zone of proximal development, learners cannot complete tasks unaided, but can complete them with guidance.

Rom Harré and Fathali Moghaddam suggest that positioning theory adds to the work of earlier theorists like Lev Vygotsky. Positioning theory is explicitly consistent with Vygotskian approaches to learning and teaching, and is applicable to educational research with its emphasis on individual and social attributes. Vygotsky theorized that positive social support can lead to an individual attaining higher mental functioning. In Vygotsky's zone of proximal development (ZPD), a learner can increase their performance on tasks when given support by adults or when collaborating with their peers. Harré and Moghaddam explain that positioning theory can fill the "gap" in Vygotsky's work by emphasizing the variability of positions that come about in a group that might be supporting that learner.

Positioning theory highlights the individual and knowledge of the participants in the education context. In such contexts, role and position can seem to overlap and many see positioning as another way of explaining someone's role. The constructs are quite different, as a role is static and a position changes depending on the context. Davies and Harré explain this difference with an example of the role of a "mother". There is a general understanding of the role that a mother plays in someone's life, but what is missing is the internalized understanding of "mother" to each individual person that plays that role. That is, each person has a unique lived experience that affects his or her position. One may anticipate becoming a mother, or one may never be in this position. Additionally, the person could have a strong or poor relationship with their own mother. There is a history of narratives out of each lived experience that determine one's position towards the idea of "mother". This can be applied in educational contexts when looking at the difference between the "role" of a teacher as opposed to the "position" of a teacher.

== Individual and social attributes ==
=== The positioning triangle ===
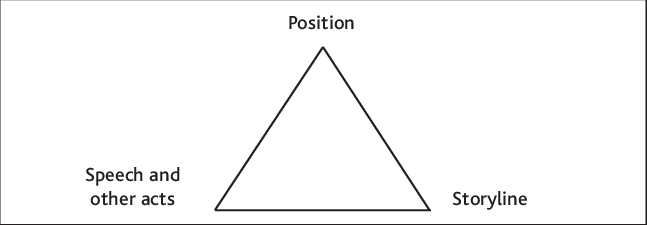
Positioning triangle adapted from Van Langenhove & Harré (1999a p.18)

A diagram can be used to explain the social significance of positioning acts. All corners of the triangle are intertwined; in other words, if one part of the triangle changes, then the other parts change (e.g., changing the storyline would affect both the position and speech-act). Harré and Luk Van Langenhove explain that what people can do is a function of "the capacities of people to do certain things", "the restrictions imposed upon people to do certain things", and "the intentions that people have to do certain things."

==== Position ====
Harré and Moghaddam expand upon the idea that position has both social and individual components. Harré describes "position" as "a cluster of short-term disputable rights, obligations and duties" of a person in various social contexts. These rights, duties and obligations are carried through by the characteristics and personality traits of the individual. Traditions and customs are vital sources in the formation of positions. In sum, a position establishes what an individual is authorized to say or do.

==== Speech and other acts ====
Each socially meaningful action, intended movement, or speech should be seen as an act of significance. Jumping is an example of an intended action. An individual may be performing this action to jump over an object, follow a physical education instructor, exercise, or model the movement for another person to copy. This action is only important if it is identified under rules for accepted moral or social behaviors, and given meaning under the context in which it is performed. An appropriate situation (for instance, a class of physical education) and meaningful and relevant actions (for example, an instructor showing how to jump) must come prior to the action performed (jumping by the student). There will also be consequences to the performed action (such as being graded on their ability to jump). While one speech act cannot cause another speech act to take place, it can lead to the development of storylines where new positions and other speech acts occur, and can give meaning and accountability to those other speech acts.

==== Storyline ====
As a result of speech and other acts, storylines are developed. These social episodes come about as an individual and those around them contribute to a pattern of narratives. The storylines can be seen as who has or does not have a right or a duty to act, and how they may act. When explaining a story, one's position may result in alluding to themselves as a hero, whereas another individual may have a different storyline that positions the same person as a villain. Hence, a change in the storyline could alter the initial positions of the involved individuals. Whilst individuals are conversing with one another, they can use narratives or storylines to have their actions and words be purposeful and significant to themselves as well as others.

=== Moral dimension ===
All social structures can be seen as moral orders that set forward rules for acceptable behavior. Speech acts create and activate moral orders. The capacity of individuals to act independently is derived from possibilities for them to behave against certain moral orders or to establish new moral orders. When an individual performs an action, they develop a personal moral order (e.g., justifying one's own behavior that one would otherwise deem as irresponsible or inappropriate). Personal moral orders can sometimes be seen as stronger than moral orders that are set in place for all people to follow.

=== Social situations ===
Positioning theory brings about the analysis of any social situation as it relates to these three notions:

1. There are many cultural, legal and institutional moral orders that are pre-determined and assign positions to the individuals (actors). These positions bring about powers and rights that are given to these individuals.
2. There are expanding and emerging storylines that make up a local moral order where the beginning positions can be confirmed or transformed.
3. There are personal moral orders of the individuals involved that impact what they will do and say, like refuting and accepting pre-determined positions or the positions developed through conversation.

=== Personhood ===
Positioning theory focuses on two aspects of personhood:

1. Embodied self: Singular, continuous and self-identical. It is the unity and continuity of a person's point of view and their actions in various contexts.
2. Self concept: Beliefs that individuals have about themselves, their moral qualities, their abilities, their fears, and their life. This expands into the sub-concepts of autobiographical self and social self.

A. Autobiographical self: A form of narrative self-understanding. Autobiographical selves can alter from story to story because of differences based on the audience and the situation in which the person is discussing their story.
B. Social self: The qualities and traits that an individual displays when they have interactions with others. A person's social self will vary based on context.

== Types of positioning ==
=== Orders of positioning ===
First-order positioning refers to the position an individual assumes, independent of any influence. Second-order positioning refers to changes in first-order positioning from interactions with others in a social environment. In third-order positioning, individuals outside the social environment are influenced by previous social interactions and assume positions based on what they have observed.

=== Self and other positioning ===
Self positioning includes how a person positions themselves, while other positioning is how an individual positions others. They are codependent; in order to position oneself, positions of others would need to be defined, and vice versa.

=== Tacit and intentional positioning ===
Tacit positioning is involved in everyday interactions, usually of the first order of positioning, and unintentional in nature. It constitutes what has been inherently learnt and internalized over time. Intentional positioning includes positions that are consciously assumed; depending on the end goal of the assumed position, it can be classified into four parts:

1. Deliberate self positioning: A person assumes a specific position with the intention of portraying something in a particular manner, regardless of its factual accuracy, in order to achieve a specific outcome or strategy.
2. Forced self positioning: This occurs in response to an external event and is more of an obligatory response compared to a deliberate one. For example, an individual positions themselves in a particular way in response to an annual performance appraisal.
3. Deliberate positioning of others: In this type of positioning, an individual deliberately positions others to accomplish an underlying goal. Deliberate positioning of others can happen with or without the target individual or individuals present in the social environment. A speaker including their audience in their speech is an example for the former, while gossiping would be an instance of the latter.
4. Forced positioning of others: This occurs when there are external factors present which require an individual to assume specific positions for others. For instance, a person under oath in a trial is required by law to assume positions of others.

=== Interactive and reflexive positioning ===
Interactive positioning is exhibited when a person or a group of people position another person based on their behavior and what they say. Reflexive positioning is the positioning of oneself in response to others. Davies and Harré use an example of an interaction between a student and a principal to illustrate both concepts: when a student is caught wearing a hat in the school, the principal asks the student to take it off, but the student refuses to do so and receives a two-day suspension. The principal engaged in interactive positioning toward the student when he asked the student to remove his hat and positioned him as rebellious. The student demonstrated reflexive positioning when he refused to comply. Davies and Harré suggested that storylines or positions that arise from specific interactions can sometimes carry forward to unrelated storylines in the future (for instance, the student may continue to be positioned as rebellious by the principal in future interactions that are unrelated to the past interaction).

=== Moral and personal positioning ===
Moral positioning occurs when one behaves in accordance with the rights, duties, and obligations of their role. These positions may be in the form of professor-student, parent-child, or grocery clerk-customer; a particular role results in an individual acting and responding in a certain way. Personal positioning happens based on one's individual properties and life experiences, and does not conform to a generic or expected role. For instance, a person who has studied the law might represent himself in court even without a law degree.

=== Indirect positioning ===
Indirect positioning can be seen as the use of characteristics to position an individual, favorably or unfavorably, with relation to oneself and one's own group desires. An example of this could be positioning oneself as "stupid", which might restrict that person from correcting their cognitive performance (pertaining to specific tasks) beyond a certain level. This could also be positioning someone as "irresponsible", which could result in that individual being excluded by their social group from taking on tasks which would require a certain level of responsibility. Harré and Moghaddam use an example of indirect positioning in regard to a leader of a nation being used to position the overall nation itself (e.g., Europe using the phrase "The Cowboy President" in reference to George W. Bush while also indirectly positioning the United States as an ignorant nation).

=== Malignant or malevolent positioning ===
Malignant or malevolent positioning is when the discourse about an individual causes others to portray that person in a negative light and treat them poorly as a result. One may hold a critical view of a person with a disability, for example, while being unaware of this biased perspective.

== History ==
Positioning theory originated from gender studies in the 1980s. Bronwyn Davies, professor of education at the University of Western Sydney, drew from feminist scholars to expand upon subjectivity, storyline, and narrative in positioning theory. Subsequently, Rom Harré, Luk Van Langenhove, and Fathali Moghaddam contributed to development of the theory in its early stages. Harré and Van Langenhove introduced conceptual refinements to the theory, including differences between first- and second-order positions, moral and personal positioning, tacit and intentional positioning, as well as self and other positioning.

The theory has become a framework for social discourse analysis and is used to study various social situations. Although the theory is rooted in social psychology, it has been used in fields like education, anthropology, communication studies, workplace agency, political identity studies, and public relations and strategic communication.

== See also ==
- Cultural-historical activity theory
- Social constructionism
- Social constructivism
