= St Margaret's School, Bushey =

St Margaret's School

Location
- Merry Hill Road; Bushey, Hertfordshire, WD23 1DT; England; 51.6382°N 0.362°W

Information
- Type: Private day and boarding school
- Religious affiliations: Church of England, Christianity
- Established: 1749; 277 years ago
- Head teacher: Ben Turner
- Gender: Mixed
- Age: 2 to 18
- Enrolment: 500+
- Houses: Windsor , St John's , Southwark , Waterhouse
- Website: www.stmargarets-school.org.uk

St Margaret's School is a private co-educational day school for pupils aged 2–18 in Bushey, Hertfordshire.

The school is situated in 60 acres (240,000 m^{2}) of countryside close to London and has been co-educational since 2020.

== History ==
In 1749 the Society of Stewards and Subscribers for Maintaining and Educating Poor Orphans of Clergymen was set up in London and charitable donations to it were made by wealthy people, including the royal family and politicians. In 1760 Princess Amelia gave £100, and in 1791 George III donated £500, part of the proceeds of one of George Frideric Handel's musical performances in Westminster Abbey. A school for 20 girls was set up in a house in Southwark, London, and the boys were sent to an existing school in Thirsk, North Yorkshire.

On 28 April 1809, the Society was Incorporated at the sole expense of the Bishop of Durham and it became the Clergy Orphan Corporation. The Clergy Orphan Corporation paid for a new school building to be erected on land bought in St John's Wood next to Lord's Cricket Ground, and both boys and girls moved there in 1812. In 1852 the boys moved to Canterbury (now St Edmund's School).

The St John's Wood site was sold in 1895 to the Manchester, Sheffield and Lincoln Railway and the school building demolished. Today the Lord's Indoor Cricket School stands on the exact site of the old Clergy Orphan Corporation School. The eminent architect Alfred Waterhouse was commissioned to design and build a new school on land bought at Bushey, Hertfordshire and, while this was being done, the girls moved to temporary premises at Windsor. The new school was ready by 1897 and in September of that year, 80 clergy orphans, their teachers and formidable Headmistress, Miss Emily Baylee, moved in. This Waterhouse building is Grade II listed. Miss Baylee renamed the school after Saint Margaret of Scotland, who was thought to be a good role model for the girls.

In 1902 the first fee-paying pupils were admitted and in 1940 the first day girls were admitted. In 1996 the two schools, St Margaret's at Bushey and St Edmund's at Canterbury, ceased to be owned by the Clergy Orphan Corporation and became fully independent schools.

St Margaret's is now solely a fee-charging school.

== Notable former pupils ==
The Old Girls' Association of St Margaret's was established in 1897; in 1909 it assumed the name of "St Margaret's Guild".

- Christabel Bielenberg, writer
- Penelope Chetwode, travel writer
- Sally Connolly, author and academic
- Jill Ellison, head of Nurse Directors Association
- Evelyn Emmet, Baroness Emmet of Amberley, Conservative MP for East Grinstead, 1955–64
- Frances Gibb, legal editor of The Times
- Alix Liddell, British writer and contributor to the Guiding and Girl Scout movement
- Unity Mitford, socialite and supporter of Adolf Hitler
- Lady Violet Powell, writer and critic
- Emma Samms, actress
- Brigid Simmonds OBE, Chief Executive of Business in Sport and Leisure and Chair of the Central Council of Physical Recreation
