= John Peacey =

English canon and cricketer (1896–1971)

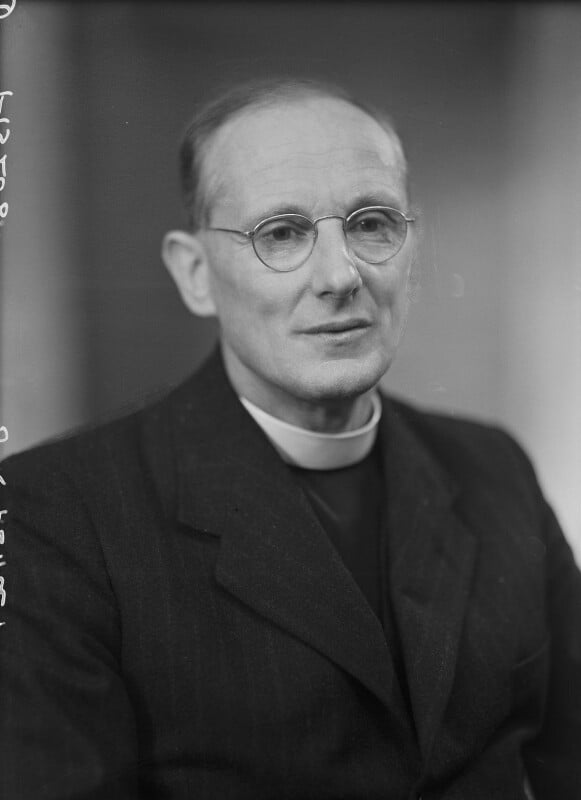
- Peacey in 1950

Personal information
- Full name: John Raphael Peacey
- Born: 16 July 1896; Hove, Sussex, England
- Died: 31 October 1971 (aged 75); Hurstpierpoint, Sussex, England

Domestic team information
- Years: Team
- 1920–1922: Sussex

Career statistics
Competition	First-class
Matches	4
Runs scored	54
Batting average	9.00
100s/50s	0/0
Top score	26
Catches/stumpings	0/–
- Source: Cricinfo, 9 December 2011

John Raphael Peacey (16 July 1896 – 31 October 1971) was an English cricketer, and a Canon in the Church of England.

Peacey's batting style is unknown. He was born at Hove, Sussex and educated at St Edmund's School, Canterbury.

Peacey made his first-class debut for Sussex against Cambridge University in 1920. He made two further appearances in 1921 against Warwickshire and Oxford University, before making a single appearance in 1922 against Cambridge University. In these four matches, he scored a total of 54 runs at an average of 9.00, with a high score of 26.

== Church ==
Peacey was also a Canon in the Church of England. He served as a missionary in India. As a hymn writer, he wrote "Filled with the Spirit's Power" was first published in 100 Hymns for Today (1969), a supplement to Hymns Ancient and Modern. He wrote some 18 hymn texts which were published posthumously in 1991 under the title 'Go Forth For God' which was released by the Hope Publishing Company.

He died at Hurstpierpoint, Sussex on 31 October 1971.
