= Ethogenics =

Research approach in social science

Ethogenics (/ˌiːθəˈdʒɛnɪks/; "the study of behavior as generated by persons who exhibit a character, an ethos", from Greek ἦθος ethos, "custom, character" and γένος genos, "birth, generation") is an interdisciplinary social scientific approach that attempts to understand the systems of belief or means through which individuals attach significance to their actions and form their identities by linking these to the larger structure of rules (norms) and cultural resources in society. For Rom Harré, the founder of ethogenics, it represents a radical innovation in traditional psychology, even a completely "new psychology" that should take its place. (Harré et al., 1985: 129).

== Roots of ethogenics ==
The origins of ethogenic social science are in microsociology and symbolic interactionism: in particular, Erving Goffman's dramaturgical sociology and Harold Garfinkel's ethnomethodology. Both Goffman and Garfinkel looked at the particular ways in which social actors manage authenticity and construct social order through their performances. Therefore, microsociologists working in this tradition are concerned with the presentation of self in everyday life.

== Ethogenic theories ==
Ethogenicists argue that the unified self (or 'I') emerges through everyday discourse and is enabled through metaphors. Rom Harré states:

All that is personal in our mental and emotional lives is individually appropriated from the conversation going on around us and perhaps idiosyncratically transformed. The structure of our thinking and our feeling will reflect, in various ways, the form and content of that conversation. The main thesis of this work is that mind is no sort of entity, but a system of beliefs structured by a cluster of grammatical models. The science of psychology must be reformed accordingly (1983: 20).

Methodologically, ethogenics starts with the social formation as the primary human reality and then shows how the human self exists within it via personally modified 'templates.'(Harré 1983: 64-65). While Harré makes a distinction between personal and social being, he does not claim that personal being is prior to social being.

By contrast, John Shotter's approach to ethogenics analyzes social action with others (as opposed to individual rule-following and performances), which is said to give individuals 'social powers.' There is no cognitive structure of the social self-independent of social context (Shotter 1983: 33). Therefore, Shotter emphasizes the practical necessities which bring individuals together in moral configurations, which it is necessary to hermeneutically approach. Shotter believes this is a better way to understand the "accounting practices" (and resulting consciousness) of individuals than Harré's methods.

Kenneth Gergen argues that scientific activity (theories) also plays a significant role in constructing the reality and values of individuals. Gergen argues that scientific theories appeal to the common sense within our everyday symbolic world. Societal power relations are affected by groups who try to impose certain frameworks for understanding selfhood, which then guide action (Gergen 1989).

== Critique of mainstream social psychology ==
Ethogenics emerged from a period of crisis in social psychology, representing a rejection of experimental methods (Ginsburg 1995). Such methods apply external "treatments" to groups of individuals rather than studying the personal "sense-making" in which individuals must engage to live in society.

== Key theorists ==
The following authors all belong to the ethogenic school:

- Nicola de Carlo
- David D. Clarke
- Kenneth Gergen
- Rom Harré
- Paul F. Secord
- John Shotter

== See also ==
- Symbolic interactionism
- Dramaturgy (sociology)
- Ethnomethodology
- Verstehen
- Microsociology
- Social constructionism
