= Nick Kemp =

English cricketer

Personal information
- Full name: Nicholas John Kemp
- Born: 16 December 1956 (age 69); Bromley, London
- Batting: Right-handed
- Bowling: Right-arm fast-medium
- Role: All-rounder

Domestic team information
- Years: Team
- 1977–1981: Kent
- 1982: Middlesex
- FC debut: 4 May 1977 Kent v Australians
- Last FC: 9 June 1982 Middlesex v Glamorgan
- LA debut: 31 July 1977 Kent v Gloucestershire
- Last LA: 30 May 1982 Middlesex v Essex

Career statistics
Competition	FC	List A
Matches	18	8
Runs scored	210	22
Batting average	14.00	7.33
100s/50s	0/0	0/0
Top score	46*	11
Balls bowled	1,347	348
Wickets	16	8
Bowling average	50.06	33.62
5 wickets in innings	1	0
10 wickets in match	0	0
Best bowling	6/119	3/47
Catches/stumpings	8/–	0/–
- Source: Cricinfo, 5 April 2014

Nicholas John Kemp (born 16 December 1956) is an English businessman and former professional cricketer.

Kemp was born at Bromley in Greater London and educated at Tonbridge School. He first played for Kent County Cricket Club's Second XI in 1974 and toured the West Indies with a Young England side in 1976. He made his first-class cricket debut for Kent in May 1977 against the touring Australians.

Kemp made 13 first-class appearances for the Kent First XI as well as playing eight times in limited-overs cricket for the county between 1977 and 1981, primarily as a bowling all-rounder. He moved to Middlesex in 1982, making a further five first-class and one limited overs appearances. In his 18 first-class matches he took 16 wickets, six of which came in one match against Surrey in 1980.

After leaving Middlesex, Kemp developed a career in wealth management, going on to found and manage Stoneford Administration Services, a financial services company. His son, Ben, was a member of Kent's Cricket Academy for young players before progressing to play several matches for the county Second XI and three first-class matches for the Oxford MCC University side.
