= Paul F. Secord =

American social psychologist (1917–2017)

Paul Frank Secord
- Born: 1917
- Died: 2017 (aged 99–100)

Academic background
- Education: Ripon College (Wisconsin); Stanford University
- Thesis: The homonym word association test (1950)

Academic work
- Discipline: Social psychology
- Institutions: University of Nevada, Reno; University of Houston

Paul F. Secord (1917–2017) was an American social psychologist.

== Academic career ==
Secord began his career at the Ripon College (Wisconsin) where he obtained a BA in psychology in 1942. He proceeded to Stanford University where he completed a MA (1948) followed by a PhD (1950) in social psychology.

He obtained a post in the Department of Psychology, Sociology & Anthropology at the University of Nevada, Reno in 1955 where he stayed for seven years. In 1962 he was appointed to faculty at the University of Houston where he remained for the remainder of his career. He retired as professor emeritus of Educational Leadership and Cultural Studies. He then spent time in the Department of Urban Studies at Queens College, City University of New York.

== Research ==
Secord conducted a series of research projects on aspects of social perception. He had a significant impact in the 1960s and 1970s with the publication of a series of textbooks on social psychology which he co-authored with his colleague Carl Backman, a sociologist, while at the University of Nevada, Reno (UNR). These textbooks became foundational in the development of social psychology as a distinct discipline. The Social Psychology Programme at UNR has established a Founder's Award to honor the contribution to the discipline of Secord, Backman and Jerry Ginsburg, another social psychologist.

In 1972 he co-authored a significant book on social psychology with Rom Harré (Harré & Secord, 1972, 1976) which was part of the move in the 1970s to develop a new approach within social psychology. This book advanced a range of new ideas and promoted the concept of ethogenics and provoked substantial debate. Rom Harré and Secord were founding editors of the Journal for the Theory of Social Behaviour to further advance their ideas and in which they often wrote editorials. Secord also authored several articles exploring the theoretical roots of social psychology. Their approach provided a theoretical base for subsequent empirical work on a range of topics ranging from the rules underlying disorder among young people, to the impact of rule-breaking on health, to rules underlying smoking among young people.

== Positions ==
- 1975 - President, Division of Social Psychology and Personality, American Psychological Association

== Key publications ==
=== Books ===
- Secord, P.F. (ed.) (1982). Explaining human behavior. Consciousness, Human Action and Social Structure. London: Sage.
- Guttentag, M., & Secord, P.F. (1983). Too many women?: The Sex Ratio Question. London: Sage.
- Secord, P.F, Backman, C.W., & Slavitt, D.R. (1976). Understanding social life. An Introduction to Social Psychology. New York: McGraw-Hill.
- Harré, R., & Secord, P.F. (1976). The explanation of social behaviour. London: Wiley-Blackwell
- Harré, R., & Secord, P.F. (1972). The explanation of social behaviour. New Jersey: Rowman & Littlefield.
- Backman, C.W., & Secord, P.F. (1968). A social psychological view of education. New York: Harcourt Brace
- Backman, C.W., & Secord, P.F. (eds.) (1966). Problems in social psychology. New York: McGraw Hill
- Secord, P.F, & Backman, C.W. (1964, 1974) Social psychology. New York: McGraw-Hill.

=== Journal articles ===
- Secord, P.F. (1990). Explaining social behavior. Theoretical & Philosophical Psychology. 10:25-38
- Peevers, B. H., & Secord, P. F. (1973). Developmental changes in attribution of descriptive concepts to persons. Journal of Personality and Social Psychology, 27(1), 120–128.
- Secord PF, Backman CW. An interpersonal approach to personality. Progress in Experimental Personality Research. 1965 ;2:91-125
- Backman, C.W., Secord, P.F., & Peirce, J.R. (1963). Resistance to change in the self-concept as a function of consensus among significant others. Sociometry, 26 (1), 102–111.
- Backman, C.W., & Secord, P.F. (1962). Liking, Selective Interaction, and Misperception in Congruent Interpersonal Relations. Sociometry, 25 (4), 321–335.
- Secord, P. F., & Backman, C. W. (1961). Personality theory and the problem of stability change in individual behavior: An interpersonal approach. Psychological Review, 68(1), 21–32.
- Backman, C. W., & Secord, P. F. (1959). The Effect of Perceived Liking on Interpersonal Attraction. Human Relations, 12(4), 379–384.
- Secord, P. F., Bevan, W., & Katz, B. (1956). The Negro stereotype and perceptual accentuation. The Journal of Abnormal and Social Psychology, 53(1), 78–83.
- Jourard, S. M., & Secord, P. F. (1955). Body-cathexis and the ideal female figure. The Journal of Abnormal and Social Psychology, 50(2), 243–246
- Secord, P.F., Dukes, W.F., & Bevan, W. (1954). Personalities in faces. I. An experiment in social perceiving. Genetic Psychology Monograph, 49(2):231-79.
- Secord, P.F., & Jourard, S.M. (1953). The appraisal of body-cathexis: body-cathexis and the self. Journal of Consulting Psychology, 17 (5), 343–347.
- Secord, P. F. (1953). Objectfication of word association procedures by the use of homonyms: a measure of body-cathexis. Journal of Personality, 21, 479–495.
