= Rom Harré =

New Zealand-British philosopher and psychologist (1927–2019)

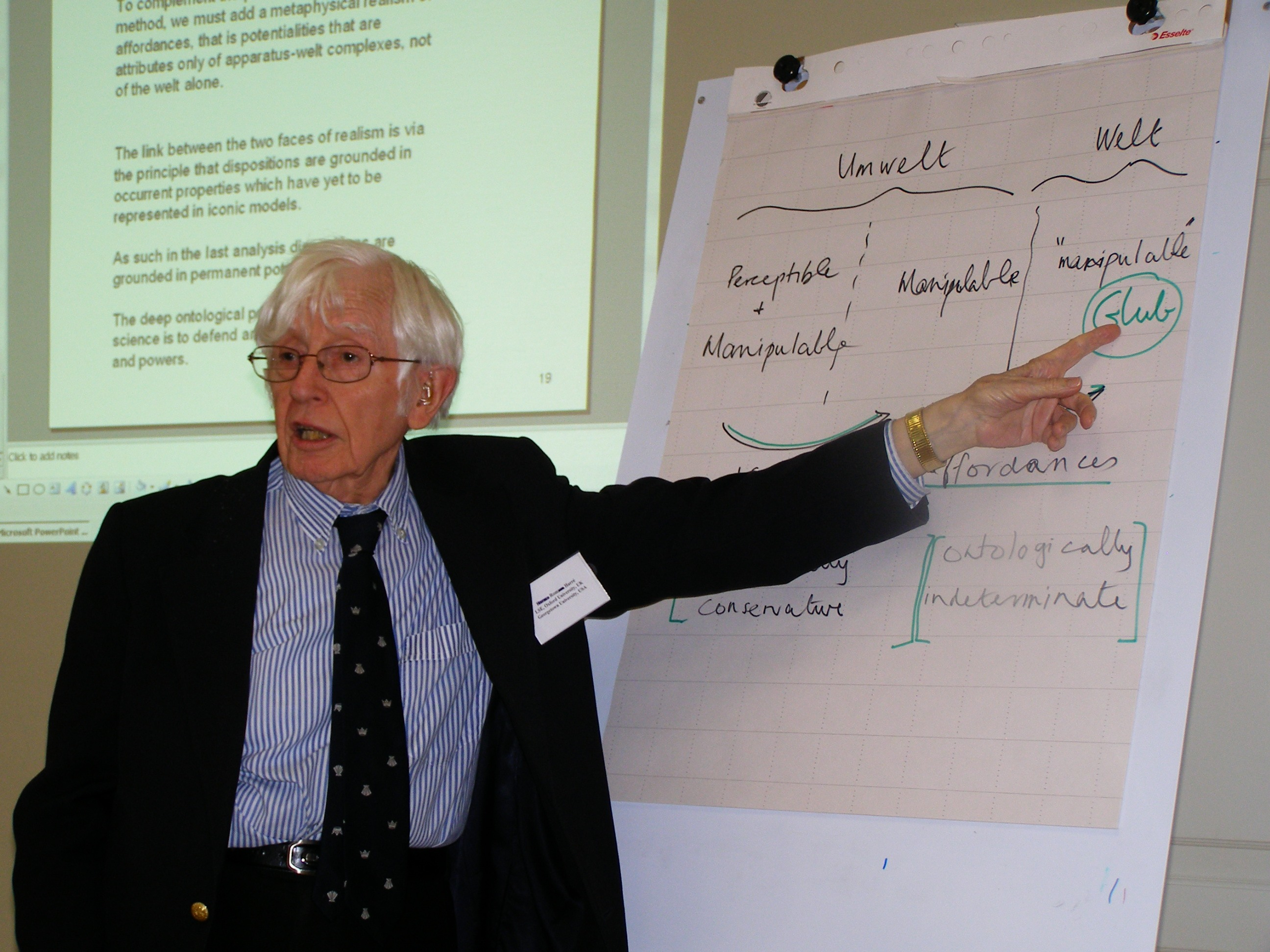
- Harré in Tartu (2011)
- Born: Horace Romano Harré; 18 December 1927; Āpiti, New Zealand
- Died: 17 October 2019 (aged 91)

Education
- Education: University of New Zealand (now University of Auckland; BSc, 1948; MA, 1952); University of Oxford (BPhil, 1956)

Philosophical work
- Era: Contemporary philosophy
- Region: Western philosophy
- School: Analytic philosophy Scientific realism
- Institutions: Georgetown University
- Notable students: E. J. Lowe, Alison Wylie, Roy Bhaskar
- Main interests: Philosophy of the social sciences Philosophy of physics
- Notable ideas: Ethogenics, positioning theory, referential realism

Horace Romano "Rom" Harré (/ˈhæreɪ/; 18 December 1927 – 17 October 2019) was a New Zealand-British philosopher and psychologist.

== Biography ==
Harré was born in Āpiti, in northern Manawatu, near Palmerston North, New Zealand, but held British citizenship. He studied chemical engineering and later graduated with a BSc in mathematics (1948) and a Master's in Philosophy (1952), both at the University of New Zealand, now the University of Auckland.

He taught mathematics at King's College, Auckland (1948–1953) and the University of Punjab in Lahore, Pakistan (1953–54). He then studied at University College, Oxford, where he completed a B.Phil. under the supervision of J. L. Austin in 1956. After a fellowship at the University of Birmingham, he was lecturer at the University of Leicester from 1957 to 1959.

He returned to Oxford as the successor to Friedrich Waismann as University Lecturer in Philosophy of Science in 1960. At Oxford, where he was a Fellow of Linacre College, he was active in the founding of the Honours School of Physics and Philosophy. He also played an important part in the discursive turn in social psychology, a field he came to in the middle of his career. After his retirement from Oxford in 1995, he joined the psychology department of Georgetown University (having previously taught at that university during Spring Semesters). There he continued as Distinguished Research Professor until he retired in 2016.

Harré gave yearly short courses as an adjunct professor at Binghamton University from 1975 through 1998 and occasional courses at both American University in Washington, D.C., and at George Mason University at Fairfax, Virginia. From 2009 until 2011 he served as Director of the Centre for Philosophy of Natural and Social Science at the London School of Economics in conjunction with his US post. He was visiting professor at many places, teaching courses at Aoyama University, Tokyo; Universidad Santiago de Compostela, Spain; Universidad Peruana Cayetano Heredia, Lima, Peru; Free University at Brussels; Aarhus University in Denmark and elsewhere.

== Philosophical work ==
Harré was one of the world's most prolific philosophers of social science. He wrote on a wide variety of subjects including: philosophy of mathematics, philosophy of science, ontology, psychology, social psychology, chemistry, sociology and philosophy. He was an important early influence on the philosophical movement critical realism, publishing The Principles of Scientific Thinking in 1970 and Causal Powers with E. H. Madden in 1975. He supervised Roy Bhaskar's doctoral studies, and continued to maintain close involvement with realism. He also supervised Patrick Baert, German Berrios, and Jonathan Smith's doctoral studies, respectively in social theory, history and epistemology of psychiatry, and social psychology. Another one of Harré's distinctive contributions was to the understanding of the social self in microsociology, which he called "ethogenics:" this method attempts to understand the systems of belief or means by which individuals can attach significance to their actions and form their identities, in addition to the structure of rules and cultural resources that underlie these actions. He developed these ideas in The Explanation of Social Behaviour which he authored with Paul F. Secord in 1972. Subsequently in his 2002 book Cognitive Science, Harré's addresses biologically reductionist and false dualism tendencies, proposing a Wittgensteinian framework of dynamically interacting “persons,” “organisms,” and “molecules” grammars in which person-level descriptions of action, normativity, and experience retain conceptual priority over biological accounts. In his later years Harre returned to his first love of chemistry and became the honorary president of the International Society for the Philosophy of Chemistry. In addition to regular lectures and articles on the subject, he organized two international conferences on the philosophy of chemistry, one in Oxford and the second at the London School of Economics while he was the director of its Center for the Philosophy of Science.

== Personal life ==
Harré was the uncle of New Zealand politician and trade unionist Laila Harré and professor of psychology and environmentalist Niki Harré.

== Awards and honours ==
- Honorary doctorate, Helsinki (1986)
- Honorary doctorate, Brussels (1986)
- Honorary doctorate, Universidad Peruana Cayetano Heredia, Lima, Peru (1998)
- Honorary doctorate, Aarhus University, Denmark (1998)
- Lifetime Achievement Award from the American Psychological Association, Society for Theoretical and Philosophical Psychology (2010)
- Honorary doctorate, Massey University, 2012
- Theodore Sarbin Award from the American Psychological Association, Society for Theoretical and Philosophical Psychology (2014).

=== Festschriften ===
- Harré and his critics (1989) (ed.) R. Bhaskar Oxford: Blackwell
- Rom Harré's scientific realism (1993) (ed.) A.A. Derksen, Tilburg: Tilburg University Press
- International Studies in Philosophy of Science Harré number: 1995 (ed.) W. Newton-Smith
- Dialectica: Harré number: 1997 (ed.) B. Muller.
- The Second Cognitive Revolution: A Tribute to Rom Harré, (2019) (ed.) Christensen, Bo Allesøe

== Publications ==
Books

- Harré, H. Rom with F.M. Moghaddam. Psychology for the Third Millennium. London and Los Angeles: Sage, 2012.
- Harré, H. Rom with P.Q. Pfordresser and S-L Tan. Introduction to the Psychology of Music. London: Psychology Press, 2010.
- Harré, H. Rom, Ed. L. van Langenhove. People and Societies. London: Routledge, 2010.
- Harré, H. Rom. Pavlov’s Dogs and Schrödinger’s Cat. Oxford: OUP (Chinese edition), 2009.
- Harré, H. Rom. Key Thinkers in 20th Century Psychology. London: Sage, 2006.
- Harré H. Rom with Michael Tissaw. Wittgenstein and Psychology. Basingstoke, UK: Ashgate, 2005.
- Harré, H. Rom. Modeling: Gateway to the Unknown. Amsterdam and Oxford: Elsevier, 2005.
- Harré, H. Rom. Cognitive Science: A Philosophical Introduction. Los Angeles: Sage (Chinese translation), 2002.
- Harré, H. Rom with J-M. Saguillo. Los problemas de la metafisica: Siglo XX. Madrid: Duque, 2001.
- Harré, H. Rom. One thousand years of philosophy. Oxford: Blackwell, 2000.
- Harré, H. Rom. The singular self. London and Los Angeles: Sage. Italian translation, 2000, 1998.
- Harré, H. Rom with Muhlhausler, P., Brockmeier, J. Greenspeak: A Study of Environmental Discourse. Los Angeles and London: Sage, 1998.
- Rom Harre with M. Krausz. Varieties of relativism. Oxford: Blackwell, 1995.
- Rom Harre with J. Arson and E Way . Realism rescued. London: Duckworth, 1994.
- Harré, H. Rom with Grant Gillet. The discursive mind. London: Sage (Spanish translation), 1994.
- Harré, H. Rom. Social being: revised edition. Oxford: Blackwell, 1993.
- Harré, H. Rom. Laws of nature. London: Duckworth, 1993.
- Harré, H. Rom. Physical being: a theory for corporeal psychology. Oxford: Blackwell, 1991.
- Rom Harre with P Muhlhausler. Pronouns and people. Blackwell, Oxford, 1990.
- Rom Harre. Designing the discipline: a programme for psychology. Blackwell, Oxford, 1986.
- Harré, H. Rom. Varieties of realism. Blackwell, Oxford, 1986.
- Harré, H. Rom. The philosophies of science, 2nd Edition. Oxford, GB: Oxford University Press, 1986.
- Harré, H. Rom, Clarke, D., & de Carlo, N.. Motives and mechanisms. London, UK: Metheun, 1985.
- Harré, H. Rom. Introduction to the logic of the sciences, 2nd Edition. London, UK: Macmillan, 1983.
- Rom Harre. Personal being:a theory for individual psychology. Blackwell, Oxford;1985 Harvard UP, Cambridge, Mass., 1983.
- Harré, H. Rom. Twenty great scientific experiments. Phaidon Press, Oxford (OPUS paperback, 1983, American edition 1982) (Spanish, Italian, Japanese), 1981.
- Harré, H. Rom. Social being: a theory for social psychology. Oxford, GB: Blackwell, 1979.
- Harré, H. Rom. Social being: a theory for social psychology. : Blackwell, Oxford (Spanish translation), 1979.
- Harré, H. Rom, Marsh, P., & Rosser, E.. The rules of disorder. London, UK: Routledge and Kegan Paul, 1977.
- Harré, H. Rom, Morgan, J., & O’Neill, O.. Nicknames. London, UK: Routledge and Kegan Paul, 1977.
- Harré, H. Rom, & Madden, E.H.. Causal powers. Oxford, GB: Blackwell, 1975.
- Harré, H. Rom, & Secord, P.F.. The explanation of social behaviour. Oxford, GB: Blackwell, 1973.
- Harré, H. Rom. The philosophies of science. Oxford, GB: Oxford University Press, 1972.
- Harré, H. Rom. The method of science. London, UK: Wykelham Press, 1970.
- Harré, H. Rom. The principles of scientific thinking. London, UK: Macmillan, 1970.
- Waismann, F., Harré, H. Rom, ed.. The Principles of Linguistic Philosophy. London: Macmillan, 1968.
- Harré, H. Rom. The anticipation of nature. London, UK: Hutchinson, 1965.
- Harré, H. Rom. Matter and method. London, UK: Macmillan, 1964.
- Harré, H. Rom. Theories and things. London, UK: Sheed and Ward, 1961.
- Harré, H. Rom. Introduction to the logic of the sciences. London, UK: Macmillan, 1960.

Edited books

- Harré, H. Rom, & Jensen, C., ed. Beyond Rationality. Newcastle, UK: Cambridge Scholars, 2012.
- Harré, H. Rom, & Moghaddam, F.M., ed. Words of Conflict, Words of War. Santa Barbara, CA: Praeger, 2010.
- Harré, H. Rom, Moghaddam, F.M., & Lee, N.P., ed. Global Conflict Resolution through Positioning Analysis. New York, NY: Springer, 2008.
- Harré, H. Rom, & Moghaddam, F., ed. The Self and Others. Westport, CT: Praeger, 2004.
- Harré, H. Rom, & van Langenhove, L. van, ed. Positioning Theory. Oxford, GB: Blackwell, 1998.
- Harré, H. Rom, & Parrott, W.G., ed. The emotions. London, UK & Los Angeles, CA: Sage, 1996.
- Harré, H. Rom, & Stearns, P., ed. Discursive psychology. London, UK & Los Angeles, CA: Sage, 1995.
- Harré, H. Rom, Smith, J., & van Langenhove, L., ed. Rethinking psychological methods. London, UK & Los Angeles, CA: Sage, 1995.
- Harré, H. Rom, & Harris, R., ed. Philosophy and linguistics. Oxford, UK: Pergamon, 1993.
- Harré, H. Rom, ed. Anglo-Ukrainian studies in philosophy of science. Lampeter, PA: Edward Mellen, 1993.
- Harré, H. Rom, & Brown, H.R., ed. Philosophical foundations of quantum field theory. Oxford, UK: Clarendon Press, 1988.
- Harré, H. Rom, van Langenhove, L., & de Waele, J-M., ed. Individual persons and their actions. Brussels, Belgium: Vrije Universiteit Press, 1986.
- Harré, H. Rom, & Lamb, R., ed. Blackwell Dictionary of Social and Personality Psychology. Blackwell, 1986.
- Harré, H. Rom, ed. The physical sciences since antiquity. London, UK: Croom Helm, 1986.
- Harré, H. Rom, ed. The social construction of emotions. Oxford, GB: Blackwell, 1986.
- Harré, H. Rom, & Lamb, R., ed. Blackwell Dictionary of Animal Behaviour and Ethology. Blackwell, 1986.
- Harré, H. Rom, & Lamb, R., ed. Blackwell Dictionary of Educational and Developmental Psychology. Blackwell, 1986.
- Harré, H. Rom, & Lamb, R., ed. Blackwell Dictionary of Clinical and Physiological Psychology. Blackwell, 1986.
- Harré, H. Rom, & Lamb, R., ed. Blackwell Encyclopaedic Dictionary of Psychology. Blackwell, 1985.
- Harré, H. Rom, & Reynolds, V., ed. The meaning of primate signals. Cambridge, GB: Cambridge University Press, 1983.
- Harré, H. Rom, & von Cranach, M., ed. The analysis of action. Cambridge, GB: Cambridge University Press, 1982.
- Harré, H. Rom, & Jensen, U.J., ed. The philosophy of evolution. Brighton, GB: Harvester Press, 1981.
- Harré, H. Rom, ed. Personality. Oxford, GB: Blackwell, 1976.
- Harré, H. Rom, ed. Life sentences. Chichester, UK: Wylie, 1976.
- Harré, H. Rom, ed. Problems of scientific revolution. Oxford, GB: Clarendon Press, 1975.
- Harré, H. Rom, ed. Some nineteenth century British scientists. Oxford, GB: Pergamon, 1969.
- Harré, H. Rom, ed. Scientific thought, 1900–1960. Oxford, GB: Oxford University Press, 1969.
- Harré, H. Rom, ed. How I see philosophy. London, UK: Macmillan, 1968.
- Harré, H. Rom, ed. The sciences: their origins and methods. Glasgow: Blackie, 1967.
- Harré, H. Rom, ed. Early Seventeenth Century Scientists. Oxford: Pergamon Press, 1965.

== See also ==
- Philosophical realism
