= Death of Max Spiers =

British conspiracy theorist (1976–2016)

On 16 July 2016, the death of UFO investigator Max Spiers (or Maxwell Bates-Spiers) (1976–2016) caused controversy among some conspiracists, which led to reports from BBC News and other news outlets.

Spiers died on 16 July 2016 in Warsaw, Poland, while visiting a friend. In a multi-part short documentary series on his death, made by the BBC, his mother stated that she had been concerned about Spiers's mental health prior to his death and that she believed he had "gotten involved with the wrong crowd." A final video taken of Spiers before his death revealed what his mother interpreted as signs of substance intoxication; she had seen him in a similar state in the past after using heroin. Another conspiracist, who was close to Spiers, suggested that his drug use was controlled by extraterrestrial life.

== Background ==
Spiers had been interested in conspiracy theories from a young age. He later recalled various events including out-of-body experiences, which he used to justify conspiracy theories, including the belief that he had been given supernatural powers at birth. Spiers also suffered severe anxiety, which sometimes left him completely debilitated.

Spiers believed in a variety of paranormal events, such as that he had been altered as a child to become a supersoldier. Spiers's credibility as a conspiracy theorist has been doubted by other conspiracists, including Adam Borowski from Radio Paranormalium, a Polish independent journalist who stated Spiers "seemed to collect the research of other people and present it as his own," and that he had never proven any abilities related to his claim of being made a supersoldier at birth.

While in the United States, he sustained a crack to his pelvis and was prescribed potent opiates for pain relief. Spiers later developed an opioid use disorder. Unable to acquire more prescription opiates, Spiers began using heroin. There are claims that Spiers relapsed while in Poland, and a video taken shortly before his death seems to provide grounds for this; according to his mother, he behaved the same way he did after using heroin.

=== Investigation and aftermath ===
Spiers was returned to the United Kingdom six days after his death. However, the Spiers family was advised to not view his body due to the extreme deterioration his face had undergone. At this point, he was unrecognizable.

On 30 August 2016, an investigation was launched by Polish authorities into the circumstances surrounding Spiers' death, including a possible involuntary manslaughter. In December 2016, British authorities announced they would launch an inquest into his death, which is distinct from an investigation aiming to convict. A coroner told the inquest he was waiting to receive a report from Polish authorities. As a result, the proceedings were adjourned until February 2017.

On 7 January 2019, the cause of Spiers's death was released as drugs and pneumonia.

Spiers’s mother claims that the Polish authorities will not release the paperwork containing the details about her son’s death without her written consent.
