= Pro-German resistance movement in Finland =

The Pro-German resistance movement in Finland was set up during the latter stages of the Second World War after the Moscow Armistice by Nazi Germany and the extreme right in Finland, who prepared for armed struggle against the expected Soviet occupation. Germany funded the activities and provided the necessary training. The project was separate from the plans drawn up by Finnish chief of staff officers in the summer of 1944 for the transition to guerrilla warfare. When there was no occupation, propaganda and smuggling hundreds of people out of Finland became the principal activity of the organization. After the defeat of Germany, the movement did not disintegrate but operated in Finland for several more years. Some members of the movement were caught, and 11 were convicted of treason in 1946.

== Background ==
During Finland's participation on the Eastern Front, two German intelligence organizations operated in Finland: the SS intelligence service SD and the military intelligence service Abwehr under German chief of staff. The SD's Finnish arm was led by Sturmbannführer (Major) Alarich Bross, the Abwehr's by Fregattenkapitän (Commander) Alexander Cellarius. In February 1944, the organizations were merged under the SD, and in August, Bross, who had good relations with Finland's extreme right circles, was appointed head of Germany's intelligence efforts in Finland.

== SD's resistance movement set up ==
Bross was immediately tasked with forming a resistance movement in Finland that would serve German interests. The plan for the organization was presented to a select group of Finns in August 1944 at a meeting convened by Bross, which was attended by, among others, Colonel Ragnar Nordström, Lieutenant Colonels Carl Lindh and Johan Christian Fabritius, Counselor Petter Forsström and Dr. Erkki Osmonsalo. Aarne Runolinna, working as Bross's assistant, had prepared the structure draft of the organisation. At the meeting, a resistance movement in accordance with the SD's plans was established under veteran organisation "Front Soldier League". Carl Lindh was elected to lead the movement.

== Other German-led resistance plans ==
=== AKS chairman Helanen's plan ===
At the same time as the SD founded its own resistance organization, Dr. Vilho Helanen, chairman of the Academic Karelia Society, developed his own plan for a resistance movement in the event that the Soviet Union occupied Finland or a communist- led government came to power. Helanen's plan was based on the support of the Germans from Estonia. He presented his plan in Tallinn on September 7, 1944, to the local SD, and possibly Cellarius was also involved.

According to the plan, the leadership of the organization would be in Tallinn, and the liaison committee in Finland would handle communications, transportation and safehouses with the support of the Germans. Landing areas for German aircraft and landing areas for ships would be established in advance. The actual armed activity would be carried out by a regional resistance movement, for which the weapons would be obtained from the Germans and in connection with the possible disarmament of the Finnish army. After a possible occupation, a partisan war would be waged by first hitting the occupier’s communication and maintenance connections. The resistance would bind as many occupying forces as possible until they retreat to isolation in large cities. The ultimate goal was to conquer the whole of Finland and also East Karelia.

However, the plan was conditional on German troops remaining in Estonia and northern Finland, which made it impossible to implement. The withdrawal from northern Finland had already begun, and there was only a week left for the Estonian evacuation order. Helanen joined the SD resistance movement, where he was named the organization's second leader. He returned to Finland in a German motor torpedo boat with the task of attracting politicians behind the movement.

=== Other German projects ===
The SD resistance project was not the only one of the Germans. On 5 September 1944, the 20th Mountain Army Commander, Lothar Rendulic, proposed the establishment of a resistance operation at the German chief of staff. The situation was favorable due to the division of opinions caused by the ceasefire.

In addition to the resistance movement, SD also had other secret activities in Finland. SD Lieutenant Hans Seidl and Finnish Lieutenant Kai Laurell established several radio stations and weapons caches in northern Finland. Until the spring of 1945, the stations kept in touch with the German military intelligence service Sonderabteilung Lappland (Special Department Lapland). Wilhelm Laqua, head of SD's Kirkenes office and commander of Einsatzkommando Finnland, founded Karesuvanto radio station that operated in October 1944. The station was later transferred to the Swedish side and communication was maintained by couriers from Norway. In Norway, Laqua also had radio, postal and flight connections to Finland. The Germans also organized weapons caches in northern Finland and built safehouses.

== The organization of the resistance movement is created ==
Carl Lindh and Vilho Helanen were appointed to lead the SD resistance movement. Bross's assistant Aarne Runolinna was the propaganda manager. The liaison was journalist Karl Jansson, from May 1945 Lieutenant Colonel Fabritius. The organizer was long-distance patrolman Arthur Björklund, later lieutenant Seppo Veli Heikkilä. Nationwide, the organization was divided into eight districts, each of which was to have local leadership. Underground activities would be organized according to the three-cell system inherited from the Communists.

Members of the Front Soldier League, Patriotic People's Movement and different Nazi organisations were recruited. The resistance movement had good connections to various parties: several people from Valpo were involved, such as detective Urho Rantala and detective Arvid Ojasti, who moved to Norway. Arno Anthoni, former head of the Central Detective Police advised on the practical arrangements for underground operations. The organization also kept in touch with Finnish army officers who moved to Sweden and wartime military intelligence chiefs. Former intelligence chief Colonel Aladár Paasonen was present, Harri Paarma (formerly Paatsalo), Director of the intelligence gathering and sabotage unit "Remote Patrol Department", in charge of Northern Finland's intelligence, and Major Pauli Marttina, Second Director of the Remote Patrol Department.

In addition, there were plans to recruit high-ranking officers. Lieutenant General Paavo Talvela, Major General Kaarlo Heiska or Colonel Matti Aarnio were planned to be the commander of the military wing.

=== Swedish connections ===
Safehouses were built to Sweden with the help of a network of liaison officers. Two of the routes passed through the country to Norway, the others to the port cities of Gothenburg, Malmö and Trelleborg. In addition to the safehouses, the Finnish leader of the Swedish operations had assistants in Stockholm, Luleå and Gothenburg, two in each. The leader himself worked in Boden and co-operated with the Swedish military intelligence: Swedish Major Danielsson arranged passports and other assistance. The Swedish organisation's contacts with the Germans were handled either by the German military ombudsman Edmund Sala via Stockholm or directly to Berlin. The courier to Helsinki was businessman Arne Blom.

=== Financial ===
Funding for the activities of the resistance movement came mainly from the Germans. For the initial organization, the organization is known to have received an equivalent amount of €350,000 (based on 2007 value) from Cellarius. At least the shipowner, Colonel Ragnar Nordström, and Councilor Petter Forsström also funded the organization by purchasing motorboats for its use. Funding from Germany was provided, directly by SD's Major Bross, partly through a cache located in Sweden near the Norwegian border, from which Finns were allowed to apply for the amount with Bross's permission. There is conflicting information about the size of the cache, according to one information, the currency of the various countries would have been worth a total of 65 million euros (according to the 2007 monetary value). In 1945, the cache is known to have fetched currency on at least two occasions, totaling more than 650,000 euros.

Weapons, radio equipment and money received from Germany and Sweden were hidden in Närpes, Vaasa, Helsinki and Hämeenlinna. A lot of material had been placed in various caches in Vaasa.

== Sonderkommando Nord ==
After the Germans left Southern Finland in the first week of September 1944, Sonderkommando Nord was established as the governing body of the Finnish resistance movement. The department was directly subordinated to Ernst Kaltenbrunner, head of the Reich Security Main Office. Bross was appointed head of the department.

A base was established for the department on the German Baltic coast on the island of Usedom in the spa town of Heringsdorf, owned by the German navy, to which German intelligence services in Finland moved. The crew was obtained from Finnish SS men and prisoners of war from the German withdrawal from Finnish Lapland who defected to the German side. Contacts with Finland were handled by radio messages and submarines. Contact with the Finns lasted at least until April 1945, although the leadership of the resistance movement was already disengaging from German control at that time. The German military surrendered on 8 May 1945.

=== Training in the winter of 1945 ===
In February 1945, Sonderkommando Nord began training Finns for reconnaissance in Heringsdorf. In the first course, morse code and cryptography training was given to SS men. The trainees for the courses were obtained from various sources; for example, there were Finnish prisoners of war enlisted from German prison camp and other volunteers who joined the Germans. The base came from the German-occupied Kongsvinger Fortress in Norway, where Finnish SS men had been trained as group leaders for a volunteer unit from Finland.

A detachment of Finnish SS men was formed in Major Otto Skorzeny's regiment Jagdregiment in Neustrelitz. The detachment was intended to be trained for special missions, but there was no time to begin training until the war was over. There was also a small group of about twenty volunteers from those Finnish women who had moved to Norway and Germany with German troops and were recruited to the same detachment for message training.

== The negotiations in January 1945 and Fabritius travels to Germany ==
In January 1945, Major Bross, his political advisers Aarne Runolinna and Cellarius traveled by submarine from Heringsdorf to the coast of Finland in front of Kristinestad to negotiate with the Finnish leadership of the resistance movement. On January 17, Johan Fabritius, the practical organizer of the movement, and Karl Jansson, a liaison officer and journalist, were transported to the ship. The nominal leaders of the movement, Carl Lindh and Vilho Helanen, who were invited to the meeting, did not arrive to the chagrin of the Germans.

A meeting was held on the submarine, during which Jansson explained the situation in Finland to the Germans. Bross suggested that a refugee government be established for Finland and that sabotage activities in the war reparations industry be started. The Germans had planned to take Professor Toivo Mikael Kivimäki to Sweden to lead the refugee government. Fabritius refused both projects, and eventually the Germans agreed with him.

At the end of the negotiations, Jansson was sent ashore with equipment, money and weapons. Seppo Heikkilä, who had received intelligence training from Germany and was the former commander of the Navy's Liinahamari patrol ship, took part. Heikkilä had to support the resistance movement and report on Finnish conditions. Based on the reports, it would be decided when it would be time to send troops and material with special training from Germany to Finland. Fabritius stayed in a submarine to travel to Germany. He had a report with the Germans on the new organization of the Finnish army and the Soviet troops in the country. Captain Lauri Törni and Lieutenant Solmu Korpela, who had arrived from Finland, also stayed on board, and had been recruited to train in Germany as trainers for the men of the resistance movement.

The ship returned to Heringsdorf without difficulty, and Fabritius and Runolinna prepared a memorandum on the situation in Finland for the headquarters of Sonderkommando Nord. He was also transported to Berlin to present the memorandum first to Dr. Scheffer, then directly to Kaltenbrunner. After returning to Heeringsdorf, Fabritius received a quick training in parachuting, and on February 20 he was dropped off in Finland.

== Resistance action ==
=== Radio stations and propaganda ===
The organization built a network of radio stations in Finland for communication and promotion. In addition to one mobile radio station, there were stations in Helsinki at the Helvar radio factory and in Huopalahti, Hämeenlinna, Tampere, Turku, Vaasa, the Raahe region and Närpes. Thoralf Kyrre, a Danish engineer, was recruited as a technical expert.

=== Safehouse network in Finland ===
The most significant form of action was to smuggle out those who wanted to leave the country to Germany and Sweden for various reasons. For this purpose, a safehouse network was built in Finland and the cover company "Great fishing cooperative" was established. In Finland, safehouse routes were provided by a 50-70-man maritime transport organization. In Sweden, the target was the small town of Härnösand in western Norland. From Finland, the ships were driven to secret loading bays around the city, where the men of the organization were ready. Some of the smuggled men were delivered to Sweden from the north over the Tornio river. Access to Europe was opened through the Swedish safehouse network.

The resistance movement in Blacknäs, Vaasa, had three large fishing vessels at its disposal, which were well suited for the smuggling of refugees to Sweden. The most important stage of the resistance movement was established in Närpes. Motorboats purchased for the cover company were placed in Närpes. The area also served as a loading bay for German submarines. The organization bought a detached house in Närpes, and houses and farms were acquired for accommodation. Transport between Helsinki and Närpes was handled by two cars acquired for this purpose.

Through the safehouse routes, the resistance movement transported Finnish Nazis and fascists, officers and intelligence personnel, Estonian and East Karelian refugees and German citizens out of the country. Hundreds of people were assisted in Sweden, including more than a hundred German prisoners of war who had fled the Finns. Transport to Germany took place after the September 1944 break in German submarines, smuggling hundreds of people. At the same time Organisation brought refugees from Germany to the Finnish coast, sometimes in several submarines at the same time. They were transported along the safe house route to Sweden and further from there.

=== Operation after spring 1945 ===
During his trip to Germany in January–February, Fabritius had become convinced that the situation in Germany was hopeless and that no further help to the resistance in Finland could be expected. At the beginning of April, meetings were held in Lohja, Helsinki and Tampere. The organisation sought to become independent of the Germans. On the other hand, there were still fears of a Soviet occupation, and the focus of action was on plans to get as many patriotic-minded people as possible into the movement and smuggled into Sweden. Contact with the Germans was maintained still in April 1945.

After the defeat of Germany, the resistance movement continued to operate. Finland was not occupied, so the plan for armed struggle was not implemented. Activities focused on safehouses.

In 1948, representatives of the resistance movement, Major General Harald Roos and Professor Lauri "Tahko" Pihkala traveled to Norway to inquire about support for the movement in the event that the Soviet Union occupied Finland. They were in contact with the Commander of the Norwegian Army, General Olaf Helset, and the US Military Ombudsman in Oslo. The military ombudsman reported to the U.S. that the resistance movement had 100,000 infantry weapons and some grenade launchers. The movement would be ready for action with three weeks' notice. Neither party promised support to the Finns.

== Disclosure and litigation ==
The secret police ValPo was convinced of the organization's existence from an early stage. In January 1945, the radio station of the Helvar radio factory was revealed, and Valpo arrested Thoralf Kyrre. The resistance movement arranged for Kyrre to flee to Sweden in March. In early 1946, Valpo tracked down the organization and arrested its leaders during the spring, such as Fabritius on April 12. Karl Jansson, Arthur Björklund and Ragnar Nordström fled to Sweden. Eleven people were convicted in a treason trial, and the longest sentence, 7 years in prison, was given to Karl Sundholm, who helped Kyrre escape. Lauri Törni and Seppo Heikkilä trained at Sonderkommando Nord received six years in prison, others shorter sentences. Fabritius, who served as the leader of the resistance movement, died in pre-trial detention in the fall of 1946 before sentencing.

== See also ==
- Aarne Kauhanen
- Karl Jansson
- Ratlines (World War II aftermath)
- Thoralf Kyrre
- Arvid Ojasti

== Sources ==
- Kumenius, Otto: Tiedustelu - tehtävä yli rajojen:viiden rintaman vastavakoilija muistelee ja kertoo. Muistelmat. Alea-Kirja, 1969. ISBN 951-9272-73-9.
