= Thoralf Kyrre =

Danish engineer

Thoralf Kyrre (28 December 1913 – 27 November 1960 in Copenhagen, Denmark) was a Danish engineer who was involved in the pro-German resistance movement in Finland from 1944 to 1945.

== Biography ==
Kyrre was a Danish supporter of Nazism who arrived in Finland as a volunteer during the Winter War, a war between the Soviet Union and Finland from 1939 to 1940, and remained in the country working as an engineer at the Helvar radio factory. Kyrre was sentenced to prison in Denmark in 1939 after breaking into the Social Democratic Party office and installing listening devices on the premises of the Soviet Trade Mission.

During the Continuation War, Kyrre worked for the Finnish State Police (Valpo), led by Arno Anthoni; among other things, he installed wiretapping devices in the detention cells at Valpo's Ratakatu headquarters and was involved in the development of a wiretapping device that could be used to listen to what was being said in the vicinity of the phone. This device was used by Valpo to listen on the homes of opposition elements.

== After the armistice ==
After the Moscow Armistice in 1944, Kyrre set up a secret radio station in the attic of his Helvar radio factory in Pitäjänmäki, Helsinki, to send reports from German agents operating in Finland to Germany. The antennas of the radio station did not attract attention because there were many other antennas on the roof of the radio factory.

Kyrre was assisted by Elli Poikonen, former clerk of the German Embassy, one of whose tasks was to decrypt the secret codes used in radio traffic. Kyrre and Poikonen were introduced to each other by "Master Hämäläinen", who was in fact the chairman of AKS, Vilho Helanen. In the fall of 1944, Kyrre installed equipment that could be used to eavesdrop on calls from the Allied Control Commission at the Hotelli Torni. In addition to Sonderkommando Nord, the Finnish military intelligence also used these Kyrre devices. However, the ACC found out about the interception and started feeding false information to the listeners.

Valpo arrested Kyrre and Poikonen after the Helvar radio station was discovered on 23 January 1945. On 16 March 1945 they managed to escape with the help of the sympathetic Valpo detective Urho Gunnar Rantala. He was recruited by engineer Karl Sundholm. Rantala assisted in the escape because he believed the detainees were to be extradited to the Soviet Union. After the escape, investigators in the Kyrre case began to believe that there was a larger organization responsible.

Poikonen was later caught and sentenced in August 1946 to two and a half years imprisonment, but Kyrre hid in Finland for ten months and on 25 January 1946 crossed the Tornio river to Sweden. Kyrre was imprisoned in Sweden for some time, but was able to continue his journey to Denmark. Kyrre later served in the CIA in Iceland, among other places. On 6 December 1948 he sent a mocking letter to Valpo. The letter wished for "a rapid collapse of your department". Petter Forsström, Director of Lohjan Kalkkitehdas Oy, served as the funder of the getaway and was also involved in the planning of the getaways.

== Death ==
Kyrre was killed in mysterious circumstances in November 1960 at his summer villa in Gladsaxe near Copenhagen.
