= Co-belligerence =

War against a common enemy

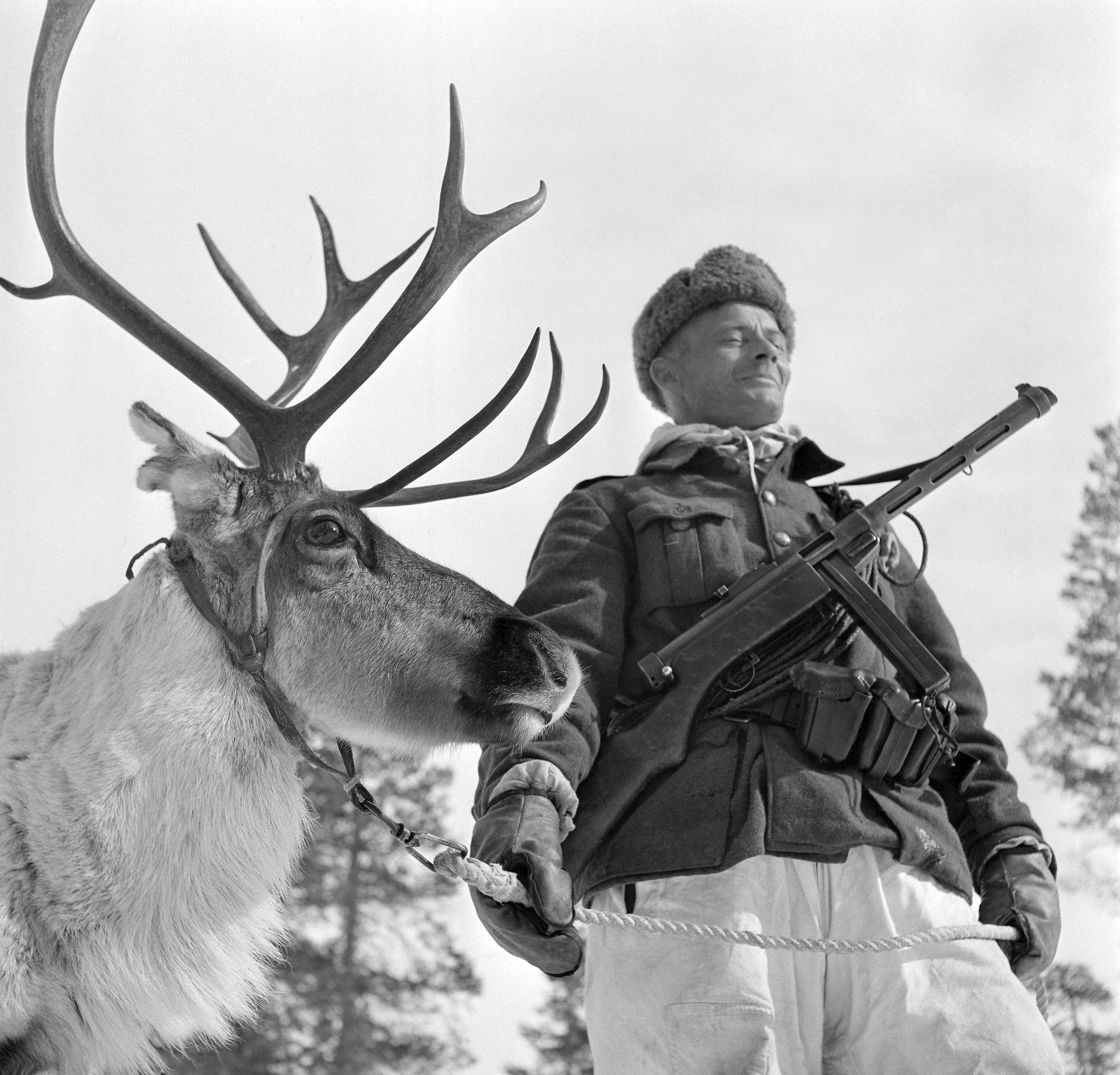
Saami soldier with a reindeer at an armoury during the last year of the Continuation War, when Finland and Germany were co-belligerents fighting against the Soviet Union.

Co-belligerence is the waging of a war in cooperation against a common enemy with or without a military alliance. Generally, the term is used for cases where no formal treaty of alliance exists. Likewise, allies may not become co-belligerents in a war if a casus foederis invoking the alliance has not arisen. Co-belligerents are defined in the Encyclopaedic Dictionary of International Law as "states engaged in a conflict with a common enemy, whether in alliance with each other or not".

== Legality ==
Under the Fourth Geneva Convention, nationals of a co-belligerent state are not regarded as protected persons if their state has normal diplomatic relations with an allied nation. Article 4 of the convention states:

[N]ationals of a co-belligerent State, shall not be regarded as protected persons while the State of which they are nationals has normal diplomatic representation in the State in whose hands they are.

In other words, it is not a war crime under international humanitarian law for foreign co-belligerent citizens to be subjected to atrocities whether in their own territory or in occupied territory by allied belligerent troops. Much like in the time of peace, such wartime atrocities would fall under the co-belligerent nation's domestic law or the allied belligerent's own military law. The International Committee of the Red Cross (ICRC) commentary of 1958 stated:

The case of nationals of a co-belligerent State is simpler. They are not considered to be protected persons so long as the State whose nationals they are has normal diplomatic representation in the belligerent State or with the Occupying Power. It is assumed in this provision that the nationals of co-belligerent States, that is to say, of allies, do not need protection under the Convention.

There are certain exceptions to this rule, however. On a judgement issued on July 15, 1999 on The Prosecutor v. Duško Tadić case, the International Criminal Tribunal for the former Yugoslavia (ICTY) appeals chamber noted that nationals of a co-belligerent state would be afforded the status of "protected persons" under the Fourth Geneva Convention if they "are deprived of or do not enjoy diplomatic protection."

== Historical examples in World War II ==
=== Germany and the Soviet Union as co-belligerents in Poland ===
After the invasion of Poland in September 1939, Nazi Germany and the Soviet Union partitioned Poland in accordance with the terms of the Molotov–Ribbentrop Pact. Although both countries invaded Poland, they had no formal, open alliance; The pact was formally an agreement of mutual neutrality. German and Soviet cooperation against Poland in 1939 has been described as co-belligerence.

=== Finland as co-belligerent with Germany in the Continuation War ===
Co-belligerence (Finnish: kanssasotija, Swedish: medkrigförande) was also the term used by the wartime government of Finland for its military co-operation with Germany (who they called their "brothers-in-arms") during World War II. During the Continuation War (1941–1944), both countries had the Soviet Union as a common enemy. Finnish reentry into World War II was described as a direct consequence of Germany's attack on the Soviet Union, Operation Barbarossa.

While the Allies often referred to Finland as one of the Axis powers, Finland was never a signatory to the German-Italian-Japanese Tripartite Pact of September 1940. The Allies, in turn, pointed to the fact that Finland, like (Fascist) Italy and (Militarist) Japan, as well as a number of countries including neutral (Falangist) Spain, belonged to Hitler's Anti-Comintern Pact.

Adolf Hitler declared Germany to be in league with the Finns, but Finland's government declared their intention to remain first a non-belligerent country, then co-belligerent after the Soviets started bombing Finnish cities all over the country, not the least due to a remaining neutralist public opinion. The truth was somewhere in-between:

1. By mining the Gulf of Finland Finland's navy together with the Kriegsmarine before the start of Barbarossa locked the Leningrad fleet in, making the Baltic Sea and the Gulf of Bothnia practically domestic German waters, where submarines and navy could be trained without risks in addition to securing Finland's fundamental trade routes for food and fuel.
2. Germany was allowed to recruit a Finnish Volunteer Battalion of the Waffen-SS which served under direct German command in operations away from Finnish-Soviet border. (It also recruited from non-belligerents Sweden and Spain. Germany did not recruit from countries formally allied with it until 1943 when Italy surrendered)
3. The initial Finnish offensive was co-ordinated with Operation Barbarossa (see Continuation War for details of the pre-offensive staff talks).
4. Finnish invasion of the Karelian Isthmus (northern part was Finnish territory until 1940) and to a lesser extent the occupation of over a half of Soviet Karelia contributed to the Siege of Leningrad. Finland also helped to block Soviet supply deliveries into the city and hosted, supplied and participated within the Lake Ladoga Flotilla which aimed to disrupt Soviet supply delivery.
5. A German army corps invaded the Soviet Union from Finnish Lapland, and German army and air force units reinforced the Finnish army during the decisive 1944 battles on the Karelian isthmus. Finland and Germany executed several joint German-Finnish Operations at the Finnish front. The Finnish invasion far exceeded the territory of pre Winter War Finland. Finland occupied as far as Lake Onega and Finnish troops even crossed the river Svir for a possible link-up with German troops.
6. Britain declared war on Finland on 6 December 1941.
7. Germany supplied Finland with military equipment of all kinds, ranging from weapons, uniforms and helmets to tanks and assault guns. Finland in exchange delivered rare resources like nickel.
8. Finland also extradited eight Jews (on orders from the then head of the State Police Arno Anthoni, who was deeply antisemitic – the Prime Minister of Finland, Paavo Lipponen issued an official apology for deportations in 2000), 76 political prisoners with non-Finnish citizenship and 2,600–2,800 prisoners of war to Germany in exchange for 2,100 Karelian and other ethnically Finnic prisoners of war from Germany. Some of the extradited had Finnish nationality but had moved to Soviet Union before the war, received Soviet citizenship and returned to Finland in secret.
9. Jews were not discriminated against. A number of them served in the Finnish Army (204 during the Winter War, and about 300 during the Continuation War). When Himmler tried to persuade Finnish leaders to deport the Jews to Nazi concentration camps, the Commander-in-chief of Finland Gustaf Mannerheim is said to have replied: "While Jews serve in my army I will not allow their deportation". Yad Vashem records that 22 Finnish Jews were murdered in the Holocaust, all fighting for the Finnish armed forces. Two Jewish officers of the Finnish army and one Jewish member of the Lotta Svärd women's paramilitary organisation were awarded the German Iron Cross, but they refused to accept them.

In contrast, the 1947 Paris Peace Treaty signed by Finland described Finland as having been "an ally of Hitlerite Germany" during the Second World War. In a 2008 poll of 28 Finnish historians carried out by Helsingin Sanomat, 16 said that Finland had been an ally of Nazi Germany, six said it had not been, and six did not take a position.

=== The Allies as co-belligerents with former enemies ===
The term was used in 1943–1945 during the latter stages of World War II to define the status of former allies and associates of Germany (Italy from 1943, Bulgaria, Romania and Finland from 1944), after they joined the Allies' war against Germany.

== Recent usage ==
In the post-9/11 era, the United States government has used the term "co-belligerent" to apply to certain groups connected to al-Qaeda. It has done so largely as a means of tying authority to use force against those groups to a 2001 congressional statute, the 2001 Authorization to Use Military Force, which Congress passed in the aftermath of 9/11 to authorize the President to use force against the group that had attacked the United States and those who harbored them, understood to be al Qaeda and the Taliban.

Since February 2022, Belarus has been described in some sources as a co-belligerent of Russia in the Russo-Ukrainian War.

== See also ==
- Italian Co-Belligerent Army – fighting with the Allies
- Italian Co-Belligerent Air Force – fighting with the Allies
- Italian Co-Belligerent Navy – fighting with the Allies
- 1st Bulgarian Army – fighting with the Soviet Union during the Vienna Offensive
- 1st Romanian Army – fighting with the Soviet Union and the 4th Romanian Army during the Prague Offensive
