= Never Alone (film) =

2025 Finnish historical drama film

- Teaser poster
- Finnish: Ei koskaan yksin
- Directed by: Klaus Härö
- Written by: Klaus Härö; Jimmy Karlsson
- Based on: Setä Stiller: Valpon ja Gestapon välissä by Rony Smolar
- Produced by: Ilkka Matila
- Starring: Ville Virtanen; Kari Hietalahti; Rony Herman
- Cinematography: Robert Nordström
- Edited by: Tambet Tasuja
- Music by: Matti Bye
- Production company: MRP Matila Röhr Productions
- Distributed by: Nordisk Film
- Release date: 17 January 2025
- Country: Finland
- Languages: Swedish; Yiddish; Russian; Hebrew; English; Finnish; German
- Budget: €4.1 million

Never Alone (Finnish: Ei koskaan yksin) is a Finnish historical drama film directed by Klaus Härö. Based on the book Setä Stiller: Valpon ja Gestapon välissä by Rony Smolar, it takes place in Helsinki in 1942, during the Continuation War, where the Finnish-Jewish businessman Abraham Stiller (1885–1972) tries to use all his means to save Jews from being captured by the Gestapo. The film stars Ville Virtanen in the role of Stiller.

The film had its world premiere at the 36th Palm Springs International Film Festival in the Modern Masters section.

== Cast ==
- Ville Virtanen as Abraham Stiller
- Kari Hietalahti as Arno Anthoni
- Rony Herman as Georg Kollmann
- Naemi Latzer as Janka Kollmann
- Nina Hukkinen as Vera Stiller
- Peter Kanerva as Aarne Kauhanen
- Hannu-Pekka Björkman as Väinö Tanner
- Carl-Kristian Rundman as Toivo Horelli

== Production ==
Shooting began in 2023 in Estonia. Some scenes were filmed in the Helsinki city centre, especially on Bulevardi.

== See also ==
- List of Finnish films of the 2020s
