= Toivo Horelli =

Finnish politician (1888–1975)

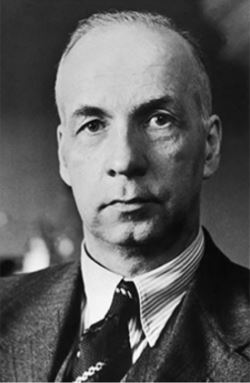

Minister of the Interior of Finland
- In office 13 May 1941 – 5 March 1943
- Prime Minister: Johan Wilhelm Rangell
- Preceded by: Ernst von Born
- Succeeded by: Leo Ehrnrooth

Member of the Parliament of Finland
- In office 1 September 1933 – 5 April 1945

Personal details
- Born: 11 October 1888 Kokemäki, Grand Duchy of Finland
- Died: 28 June 1975 (aged 86) Tampere, Finland
- Party: National Coalition Party
- Profession: Lawyer

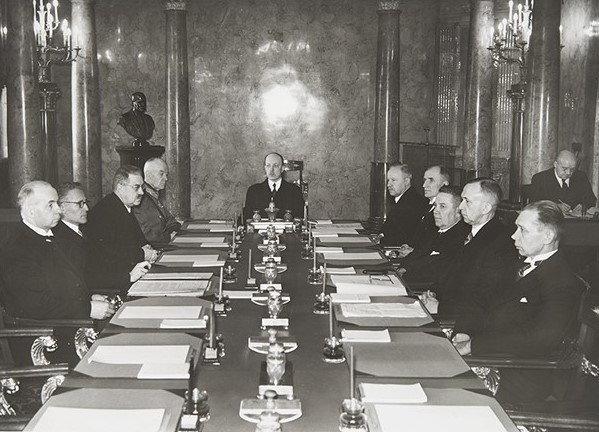
A 1941 cabinet meeting held by the president Risto Ryti. Toivo Horelli first on the left.

Toivo Johannes Horelli (11 October 1888 – 28 June 1975) was a Finnish politician of the National Coalition Party. He was a member of the Parliament of Finland in 1933–1945, and the Minister of the Interior from May 1941 to March 1943.

Horelli and Arno Anthoni, the director of the Finnish State Police, were responsible for the deportation of German refugees that were handed over to the Nazis in November 1942. Eight of the deported were Jews who were killed by the Gestapo.

== Life ==
=== Early life ===
Horelli was born in the Western Finnish municipality of Kokemäki to the family of Johan Fredrik Mäki-Horelli (1844–1931) and Amanda Giers (1850–1922). His father was an uneducated farmer who represented the estate of peasants in the Diet of Finland.

Horelli went to school in Pori graduating from the Pori Lyceum in 1907. He entered the University of Helsinki and earned the degree of Master of Laws in 1917. In the 1918 Finnish Civil War Horelli fought for the White Guard. After serving the provincial governments in Vyborg and Hämeenlinna, Horelli worked as a bank director in Tampere and Jyväskylä since 1929.

In the early 1930s, Horelli supported the fascist Lapua Movement, although he was not an active member, neither did he join its political successor IKL but stayed loyal to the National Coalition Party. Horelli was elected to the parliament in the 1933 election.

=== Wartime ===
Horelli became the Minister of the Interior in March 1943. He was pro-Nazi, antisemite and anti-communist. During his term, Horelli refused to handle the applications for citizenship by people of Jewish origin, and clashed with trade union leaders like Niilo Wälläri. In the fall of 1942, Horelli made a requisition for awarding the SS commander Martin Sandberger with the Order of the White Rose of Finland.

In November 1942, Horelli and Arno Anthoni deported a group of refugees who had fled Germany after the 1938 Anschluss. Approximately 350 refugees had entered Finland of which some 150 were Jews. As Finland joined the war in 1941, Germany was pressing the Finnish government to hand over the Jewish refugees. The matter was discussed on Heinrich Himmler's visit in the summer of 1942, and soon Horelli and Anthony secretly ordered the deportation of 27 refugees, including 8 Jews. On 8 November 1942, they were shipped to the Estonian capital Tallinn and handed over to Gestapo. According to the documents found in the Estonian state archives, the Jews were killed just two days later. The intention was to deport all Jews, but the operation was revealed, and because of the intervention of the Social Democratic cabinet members Väinö Tanner and K.-A. Fagerholm the deportations were stopped.

After the German loss in the Battle of Stalingrad, the prime minister Jukka Rangell was replaced by Edvin Linkomies in March 1943. The German-minded Horelli couldn't hold his post in the new cabinet as its main task was to make peace with the Soviet Union. He was now elected as the Second deputy speaker of the Parliament. In April 1945, the prime minister J. K. Paasikivi requested that certain persons would not stand as a candidate on the 1945 election due to their wartime action, and Horelli decided to leave the politics.

=== After the war ===
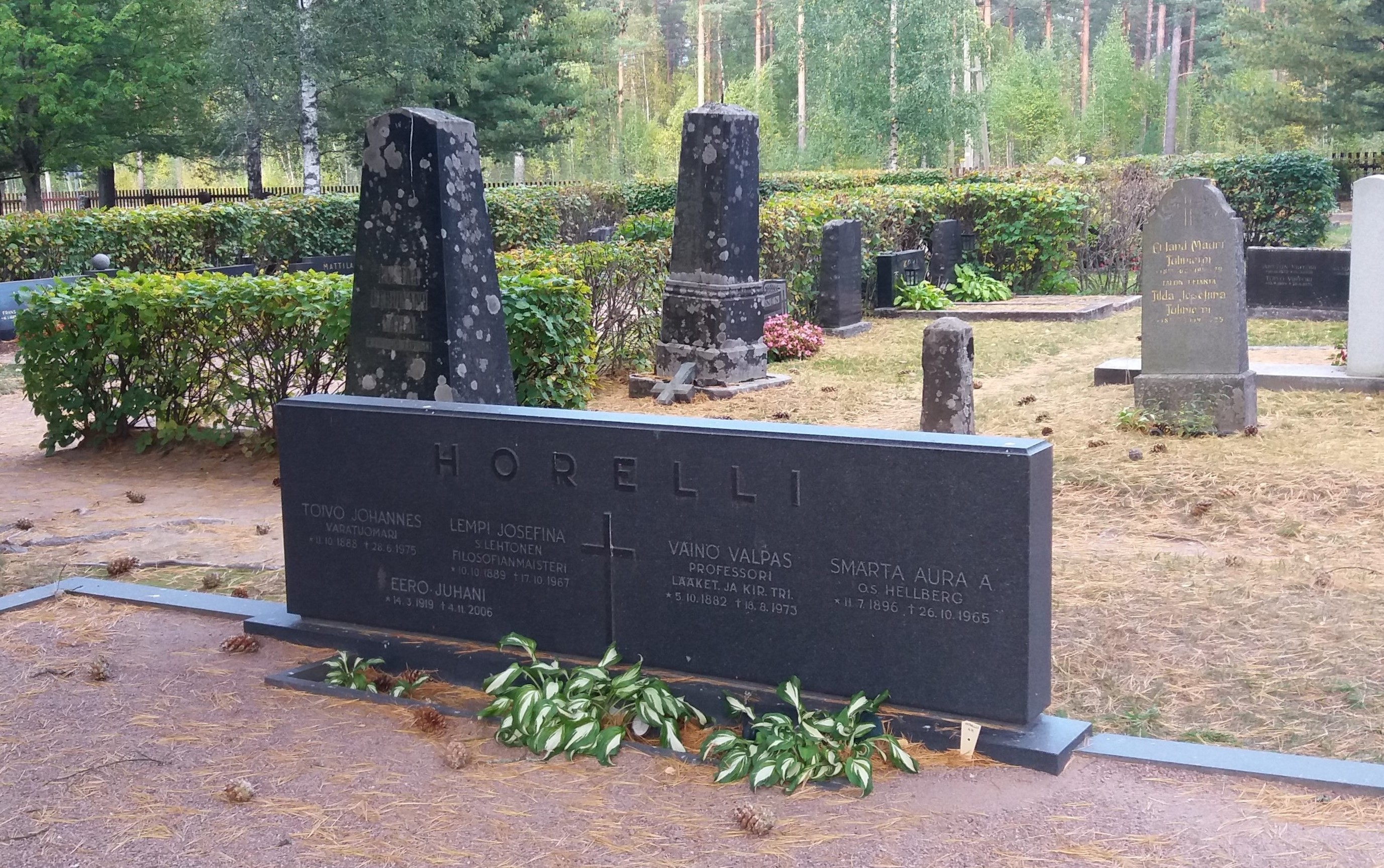
Horelli family grave in Kokemäki.

Horelli never faced a court trial. Poland and the Western Allies wanted Horelli, Anthoni and the State Police officer Aarne Kauhanen to be included on the list of war criminals, but the Soviet Union never made a claim to the Finnish government. This was most likely because the Soviets focused on people who had committed war crimes against their own citizens.

Horelli only appeared in the court as a witness when Anthoni was put on trial for misconduct. Before the trial he was questioned by Otto Brusiin. Horelli refused to tell on whose initiative the Jews were deported, saying he would only answer the question in the State court. According to Brusiin, Horelli was openly antisemitic using constantly the racial slur ″kike″ (Finnish: jutku).

Horelli never admitted the deportation of the Jews was based on their ethnicity. Instead, Horelli claimed that all were convicted criminals calling them "saboteurs, spies and thieves". However, among the deported were two children ages of 2 and 11, and only two of the Jewish adults had criminal record; one had a 10-month prison term for smuggling, and another had been fined for breaking the rationing laws. According to the Finnish immigration laws, these offenses were not a justification for deportation.

Horelli worked as a bank director in Jyväskylä until his retirement in 1951. Horelli spent his last years in Tampere and died in June 1975 at the age of 86. He is buried to a family grave in the Koomankangas Cemetery in Kokemäki.

== Family ==
Horelli married Lempi Josefina Lehtonen (1889–1967) in 1917. The couple had two children. His brothers were the professor Väinö Horelli (1882–1973) and the physician Edvard Johan Horelli (1871–1946) who was interested in eugenics.
