= Arvid Ojasti =

Finnish Detective Sergeant of the ValPo

- Nicknames: Arvi (Veikko, Maks)
- Born: Arvid Edvard Fagerström; 18 June 1903; Helsinki, Grand Duchy of Finland, Russian Empire
- Died: 6 December 1963 (aged 60) Maturín, Monagas, Venezuela
- Cause of death: Gunshot wounds
- Allegiance: Finland
- Branch: State Police
- Conflicts: World War II; Winter War; Continuation War

Arvid (Arvi) Edvard Ojasti (born Arvid Fagerström; 18 June 1903 – 6 December 1963) was a Finnish Detective Sergeant of the ValPo from 1926 to 1944.

Ojasti's personal file indicates a significant level of activity leading up to the Winter War, detailing notable Soviet spies, communists, and members of the Lapua movement. His fluency in Swedish set him apart as one of the few detectives to collaborate with Swedish police officers.

He had a strong disdain for passionate Finnish communists involved in these operations, particularly after the arrest of the well-known Red officer Toivo S. Antikkainen called "Tuiska," who had threatened Ojasti during his extradition to the Soviets in 1940.

On Midsummer's Eve, June 19, 1941, just a week before the Continuation War commenced, the Chief of the State Police, Arno Kalervo Anthoni, ordered his transfer to ValPo's Rovaniemi department. This decision was likely influenced by his proficiency in German and his notable patriotism, bravery, and skill. In Rovaniemi, his superior was Risto Linna, and he was assigned to Kemijärvi, a strategic German military base at the time. Arvid Edvard Ojasti met the German SS-Untersturmführer Wilhelm Laqua, the commander of Einsatzkommando Finnland, for the first time in Rovaniemi in 1942, and that was the only time they interacted until Ojasti and his colleagues were captured by the Germans in Kittilä. There is a possibility they had occasional phone conversations. However, these were likely limited and conducted discreetly, as he would have made any calls from his office, where visibility was restricted. Most of the claims regarding Ojasti's direct involvement in deportations are linked to his coordination with translators for Russian and German. In certain instances, these translators conducted interrogations of the prisoners directly and provided reports back to him. However, it's important to note that decisions regarding the deportation to German camps were not made independently by him, nor in Finland, as Staal 9 in Salla was a German camp. Ojasti served as the liaison for the State Police; he was responsible for receiving orders and forwarding information from Rovaniemi to his superior, Risto Linna, and likely to the State Police headquarters and Finnish military command. His role was still one of subordination. In the fall of 1941, men from the Finnish group worked in Nazi concentration camps in Norway. Some of them also moved with the Germans to the Soviet side in Karelia, where they supervised the local population and hunted for communists. This does not apply to Ojasti, since he was not in Norway before the end of 1944. At the end of the Continuation War, Arvid Ojasti did not switch sides, and he, along with his colleagues from the Rovaniemi Department, was arrested by the Germans in Kittilä. At the end of the Continuation War and Finland switched sides, Ojasti joined the pro-German movement, and was transferred to the service of the German security police under Laqua.

After the end of the war, Ojasti fled to Norway, then Sweden, and finally Venezuela, where many other Finnish Nazis wanted for war crimes had moved to exile.

Apart from his professional life, Ojasti was known to be a creative individual with a unique way of expressing himself, occasionally exaggerating for effect. He might have referred to "war spoils" humorously, as seen in the case of Aarne Kauhanen, indicating an item of value that needed to be sold for survival.

Ojasti also assisted with the trade-ins of wartime loot. He traded with fellow fugitive Aarne Kauhanen. Ojasti became a farmer, while his son Juhanni was employed as a biology professor at the University of Caracas. Ojasti's life came to a tragic end on December 6, 1963, when he was shot by a soldier guarding ballot boxes at polling stations in Maturín.
