= Ratlines (World War II) =

Nazi escape routes

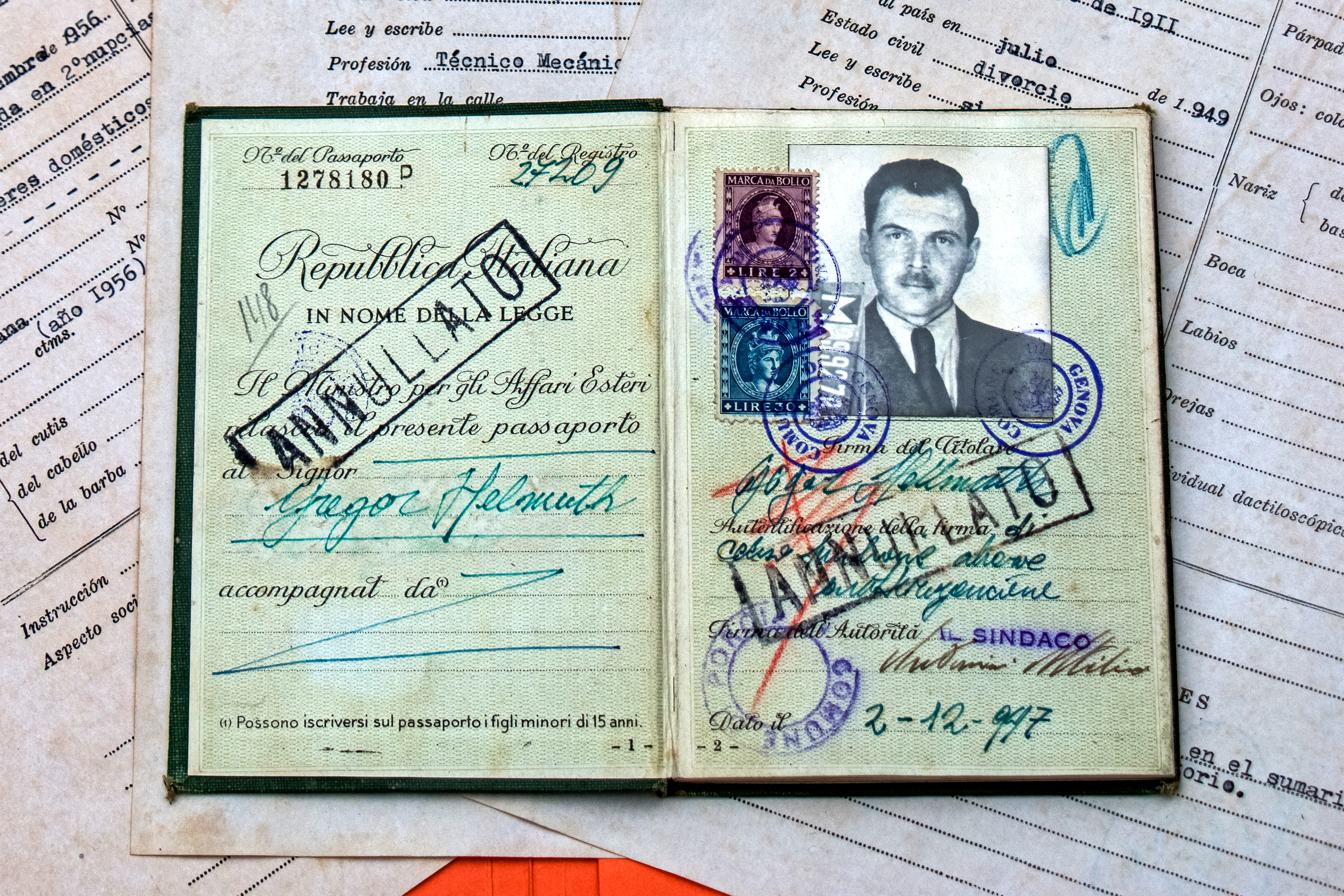
Italian passport used by SS officer Josef Mengele to immigrate to Argentina under a false name (Note: Apparently issued in 1947, the document was later invalidated, hence the Italian annullato ('cancelled').)

The ratlines (German: Rattenlinien) were systems of escape routes used by Nazis and their collaborators to flee Europe from 1945 onwards in the aftermath of World War II. Two primary routes developed independently with their operators eventually collaborating, the first transferring through Spain and the second through Rome and Genoa. Some escapees settled at these locations or used them to flee elsewhere, with the majority settling in Argentina or other South American countries such as Brazil, Chile, and Paraguay.

The ratlines were supported by some clergy of the Catholic Church, such as Austrian bishop Alois Hudal and Croatian priest Krunoslav Draganović, as well as some outlets of the International Committee of the Red Cross. The Nazis paid Argentine officials (starting c. 1943) to shield their agents, bolstering the rise of Juan Perón, whose regime set up additional ratlines through Scandinavia and Switzerland.

A number of significant Nazis and their collaborators escaped, including Ustaše leader Ante Pavelić, as well as Schutzstaffel (SS) officers Adolf Eichmann and Josef Mengele, both perpetrators of the Holocaust. Starting in 1945, the United States utilized the ratlines to aid the escape of potential Cold War assets from occupied Austria, including Gestapo leader Klaus Barbie (who had traded intel with the U.S. Army). Decades later, the ratlines remain a subject of investigation (Note: Potentially relevant unreleased files include some 6,000 documents seeming to match material confiscated from Nazi offices in Argentina in 1941 and 150 others held by Swiss bank UBS potentially related to accounts it acquired that were allegedly sourced from Nazi loot.) and cultural interest.

== Etymology ==
In sailing, ratlines are thin ropes (resembling the rungs of a ladder) used to ascend the mast. The term is first evidenced in reference to the Nazi escape routes c. 1947–1950, amid the early Cold War, when the United States Army's Counterintelligence Corps (CIC) in Austria was helping protect defectors from and informants against the Soviet Union, as well as Schutzstaffel (SS) officer Klaus Barbie (known as the "Butcher of Lyon" for his Gestapo leadership in Lyon, France) by helping them flee from Europe to South America using the Nazi escape routes under the codename "Operation Ratline" or simply "Ratline". The term ratline now denotes any specific escape route of the system, while the plural term usually references the entire scheme—sometimes more explicitly called Nazi ratlines.

== Overview ==
Two primary routes developed independently but their operators eventually collaborated. The first went from Germany to Spain, then Argentina; the second led from Germany to Rome, then Genoa, and finally South America. As many as 9,000 Nazi war criminals and their collaborators reportedly escaped to Argentina (up to 5,000), Brazil (up to 2,000), and Chile (up to 1,000). Some refugees immersed themselves in Latin America by pretending to be farmers and/or Catholic.

=== Francoist Spain ===
The origins of the first ratlines are connected to various developments in Vatican-Argentina relations before and during World War II. As early as 1942, the Vatican Secretary of State Cardinal Luigi Maglione – evidently at the behest of Pope Pius XII – contacted an ambassador of Argentina regarding that country's willingness to accept European Catholic immigrants in a timely manner, allowing them to live and work. Anton Weber, a German priest who headed the Roman branch of Saint Raphael's Society, travelled to Portugal with the intention to travel to Argentina, seemingly to lay the groundwork for Catholic immigration.

Some Catholic leaders decided to work with the Nazis in an attempt to fight against their common enemy of Bolshevism. By 1944, ratline activity which was centered in Francoist Spain was conducted in an attempt to facilitate the escape of Nazis. Among the primary organizers were Charles Lescat, a French member of Action Française – an organization suppressed by Pope Pius XI and rehabilitated by Pope Pius XII – and Pierre Daye, a Belgian with contacts in the Spanish government. Lescat and Daye were the first to flee from Europe with the assistance of the Argentinian cardinal Antonio Caggiano.

By 1946, hundreds of war criminals were living in Spain, as well as thousands of former Nazis and fascists. According to U.S. Secretary of State James F. Byrnes, Vatican cooperation in turning over these "asylum-seekers" was "negligible". Unlike the Vatican emigration operation in Italy which centered on Vatican City, the Spanish ratlines – though fostered by the Vatican – were relatively independent of the Vatican Emigration Bureau's hierarchy.

=== Italian ratlines ===
==== Bishop Hudal's network ====
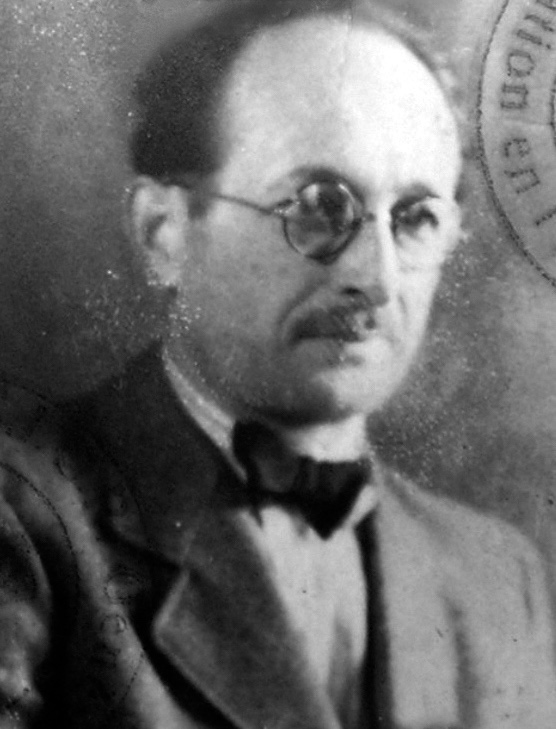
SS officer and Holocaust organizer Adolf Eichmann (disguised identity below)

Austrian Catholic bishop Alois Hudal, a Nazi sympathiser, was rector of the Pontificio Istituto Teutonico Santa Maria dell'Anima in Rome, a seminary for Austrian and German priests, and "Spiritual Director of the German People resident in Italy". After the end of the war in Italy, Hudal became active in ministering to German-speaking prisoners of war and internees who were being held in camps throughout Italy. In December 1944, the Allies allowed the Vatican to appoint a representative to visit the German-speaking civil internees in Italy, a job assigned to Hudal.

Hudal used this position to aid the escape of wanted Nazi war criminals, including Franz Stangl (commanding officer of the Treblinka extermination camp), Gustav Wagner (commanding officer of the Sobibor extermination camp), Alois Brunner (responsible for the Drancy internment camp near Paris and in charge of deportations in Slovakia to Nazi concentration camps), Erich Priebke (who was responsible for the Ardeatine massacre), and SS officer Adolf Eichmann (architect of the Holocaust); Hudal was later unashamedly open about his role. Some of these wanted men were being held in internment camps; generally lacking identity papers, they would be enrolled in camp registers under false names. Other Nazis hid in Italy and sought Hudal out after learning about his role in assisting escapes. In his memoirs, Hudal said of his actions, "I thank God that He [allowed me] to visit and comfort many victims in their prisons and concentration camps and to help them escape with false identity papers." He explained that in his eyes:

The Allies' War against Germany was not a crusade, but the rivalry of economic complexes for whose victory they had been fighting. This so-called business ... used catchwords like democracy, race, religious liberty and Christianity as a bait for the masses. All these experiences were the reason why I felt duty bound after 1945 to devote my whole charitable work mainly to former National Socialists and Fascists, especially to so-called 'war criminals'.

According to Mark Aarons and John Loftus, Hudal was the first Catholic priest to dedicate himself to establishing escape routes. The Rome office of the International Committee of the Red Cross (ICRC) issued refugees Laissez-passer documents allowing passage from Italy. These were accepted as de facto passports in South America. Although typically required to be signed for in person, blank forms were accessible to Hudal and the signature of the ICRC official was confirmed to be forged in a number of cases. In a 1948 letter, Hudal directly asked President of Argentina Juan Perón to grant 5,000 visas for fleeing Germans and Austrians.

==== Croatian Franciscans ====
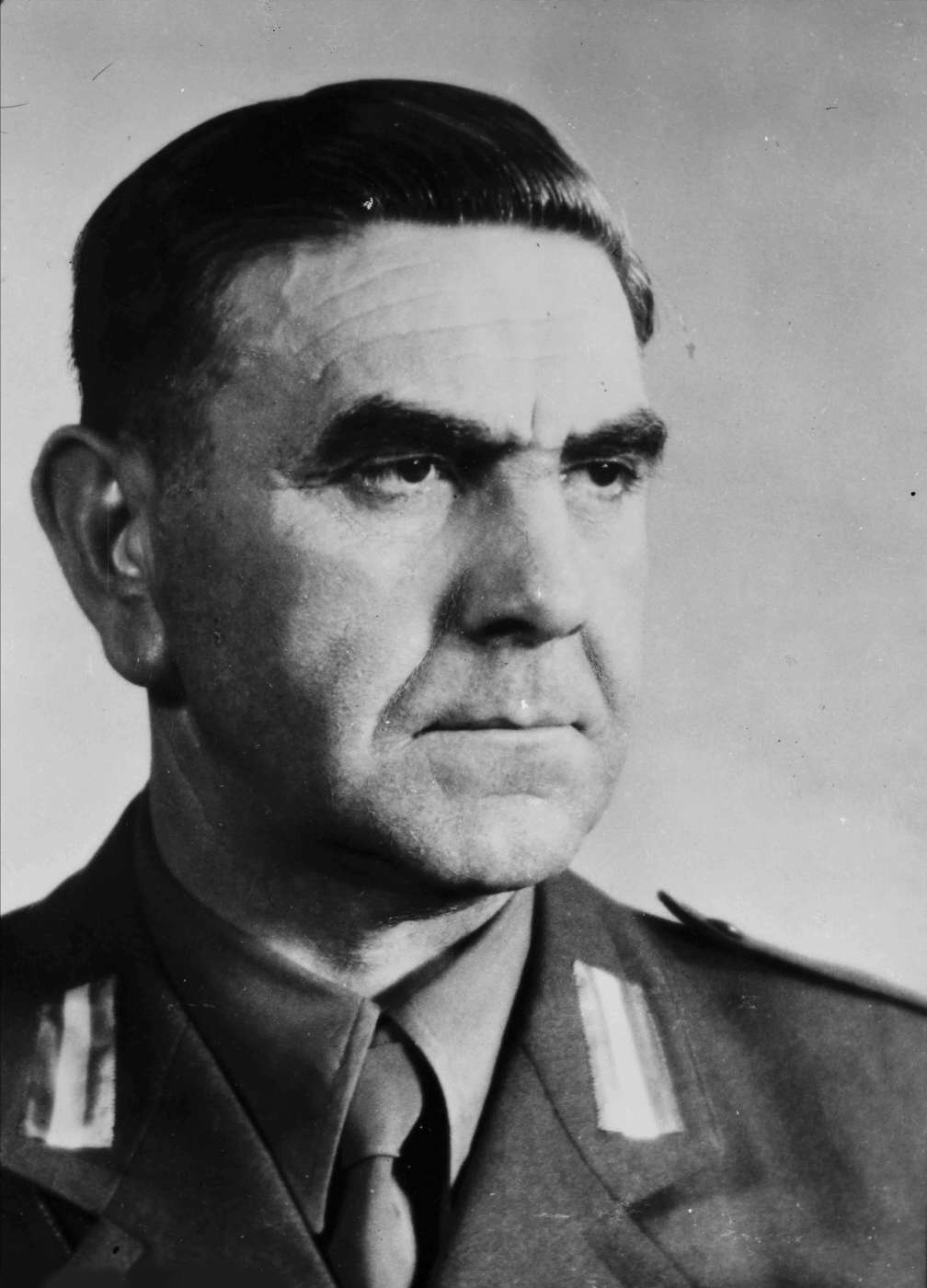
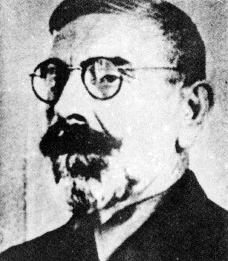
Ustaše leader Ante Pavelić (disguised identity below)

A small but influential network of Croatian Franciscan priests led by Father Krunoslav Draganović organised a highly sophisticated ratline with headquarters at the San Girolamo degli Illirici Seminary College in Rome, with links from Austria and an embarkation point in Genoa. The ratline initially focused on aiding members of the Croatian Ustaše including its leader, Ante Pavelić.

A number of priests participated, included Father Vilim Cecelja (former Deputy Military Vicar to the Ustaše), who founded a branch of the Croatian Red Cross in Austria (which the ICRC only supported in an unofficial capacity). He used his Red Cross and U.S. papers to travel freely around Salzburg, where many Ustashe and Nazi refugees remained, providing Red Cross identities to numerous individuals who lacked identification. In October 1945, Cecelja was arrested by the CIC for his Ustaše ties. Father Dominik Mandić (an official Vatican representative at San Girolamo and treasurer of the Franciscans) used his Italian secret police connections to ensure that the Franciscans' identity cards would be considered sufficiently official to issue them Italian identity cards. Finally, Draganović would phone Monsignor Karlo Petranović in Genoa with the number of required berths on ships to South America.

The Draganović ratline was an open secret among the intelligence and diplomatic communities in Rome. As early as August 1945, Allied commanders in Rome were asking questions about the use of San Girolamo as a "haven" for Ustaše. A U.S. State Department report of 12 July 1946 listed nine war criminals, including Albanians and Montenegrins as well as Croats, plus others "not actually sheltered" at San Girolamo Seminary who "enjoy Church support and protection".

In February 1947, CIC Special Agent Robert Clayton Mudd reported that ten members of Pavelić's Ustaše cabinet were living either in San Girolamo or in the Vatican itself. Mudd had infiltrated an agent into the seminary and confirmed that it was "honeycombed with cells of Ustashe operatives" guarded by "armed youths". Mudd reported a car protected under diplomatic immunity transported unidentified people between the Vatican and the seminary. Additionally, by mid-1947, British intelligence was aware that Petranović mainly helped war criminals.

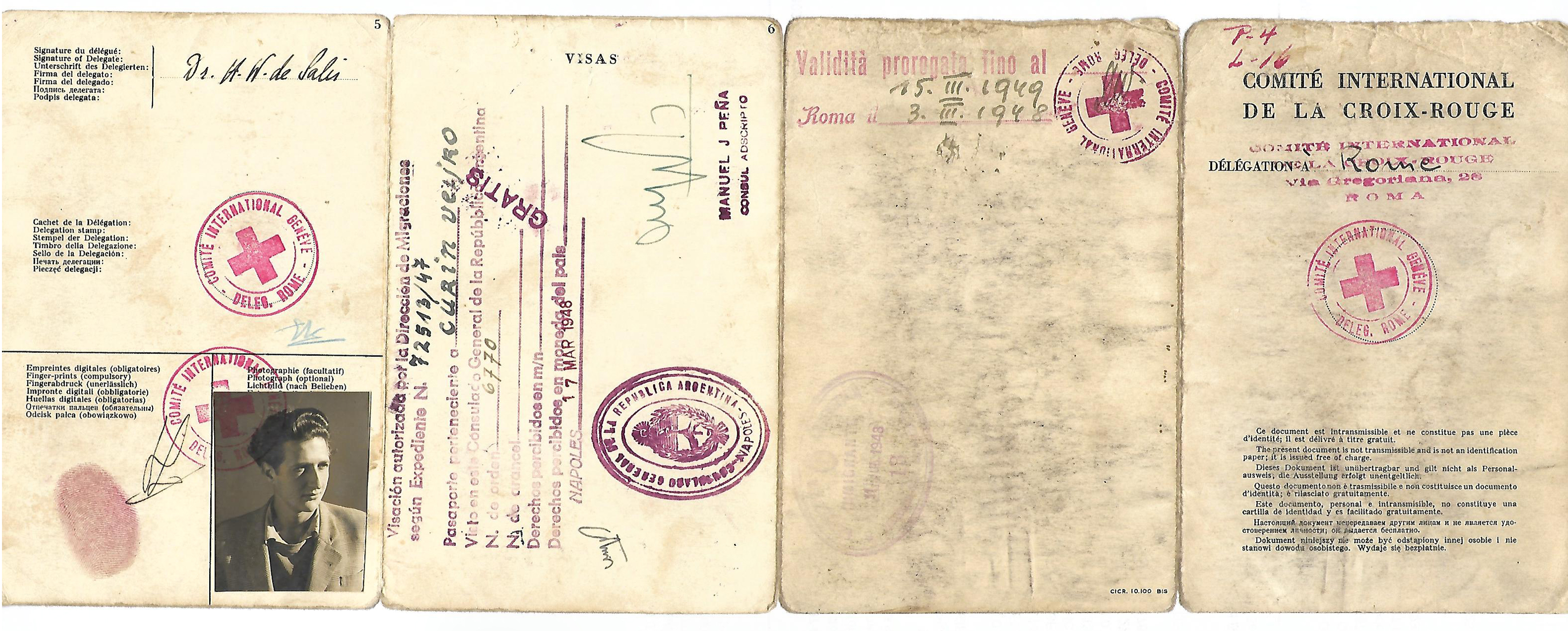
A travel ID issued to a Croatian national by the International Committee of the Red Cross

=== Nordic shelter ===
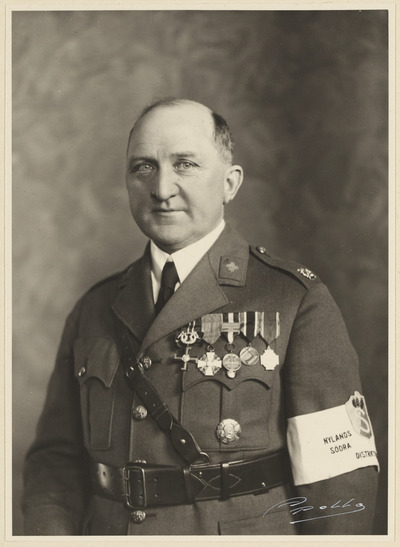
Pro-Nazi industrialist Petter Forsström

In 1944, Sturmbannführer (Major) Alarich Bross founded a network of collaborationist Finns and Nazis in Finland. Organized to engage in an armed struggle against the Soviet occupation that never occurred, it smuggled out those who wanted to leave Finland for Germany or Sweden. A system of Finnish safehouses were created under the cover of a company called 'Great Fishing Cooperative' with routes provided by a 50–70-man maritime transport organization. Its targets in Sweden were secret loading bays in the small town of Härnösand, western Norrland. Others were smuggled to Sweden from the north over the Tornio river. Access to Europe was opened through the Swedish safehouse network.

Through the safehouse routes, the resistance movement transported German citizens, officers, intelligence personnel, Finnish Nazis and fascists, and Estonian and East Karelian refugees out of Finland. Hundreds of people were assisted in Sweden, including more than a hundred German prisoners of war who had fled the Finns. Hundreds were spirited to Germany via U-boat after the September 1944 break. In 1946, Finnish industrialist Petter Forsström was convicted of treason for helping Nazis flee from Finland to Sweden, for instance by buying them motorboats.

=== Argentine haven ===
The Nazis had a presence in Argentina before the war, peaking with 2,110 members in 1935. In June 1941, Germany sent 83 boxes of documents from its embassy in Tokyo, Japan, via the MS Nana Maru to Buenos Aires. Customs agents impounded the boxes, which were searched by Argentina's foreign ministry. (Note: Five boxes contained Nazi propaganda hidden amid material labeled as "scientific, literary and cultural", while the others housed mostly children's books, magazines and war photographs.) A month later, Argentine officials raided the secret offices of the banned Nazi Party (disguised as German labor organizations). Perhaps 5,000 seized memberships from the German Labor Front and the German trade union association were stored by the Supreme Court of Argentina. (Note: In May 2025, the Supreme Court of Argentina announced its discovery of a dozen boxes of archived material, including thousands of party memberships (seeming to match the material confiscated during the July 1941 raids on Nazi offices in Argentina) as well as Nazi propaganda, passports, postcards, and photographs. As of December 2025, these documents, said to total 6,000, were undergoing restoration and digital preservation for possible legal actions and public access, with the Buenos Aires Holocaust Museum to analyze their contents.)

In 1940, Hitler's Secret Cabinet Council dispatched an agent to Credit Suisse in Zurich to set up and manage a Swiss bank account for Nazi Germany. Eventually, at least four accounts were maintained by the German Foreign Office under pseudonyms, in addition to some held by the German Red Cross and one that was used for the economic arm of the SS. German-Argentine millionaire Ludwig Freude, who oversaw Buenos Aires's German Overseas Bank (a subsidiary of Deutsche Bank), made contact with Swiss banks; by 1941, Nazi supporters in Argentina held as many as 890 accounts. In May 1943, SS functionary Walter Schellenberg secured a secret agreement with the Argentine military that excluded Nazis from arrest in Argentina and established a diplomatic pouch exchange system between the two regimes. The Argentine nationalists conducted a coup d'état that June, opening a way for Juan Perón's rise to power. Meanwhile, German wealth derived from looting Holocaust victims was placed in a Reichsbank account under the false name of Max Heiliger. By 1944, this was worth millions of Reichsmarks, in addition to shipments to the Reich Chancellery headquarters of Martin Bormann. SS officer Otto Skorzeny facilitated the international transfer of wealth from the account, reportedly depositing it in the name of Perón's future wife, Eva. According to The New York Times, the U.S. State Department reported in 1945 that "the personal fortunes of Nazi officials" were delivered to Buenos Aires via diplomatic pouch, with Nazi higher-up Hermann Göring possessing over US$20 million and a U-boat loaded with Nazi loot.

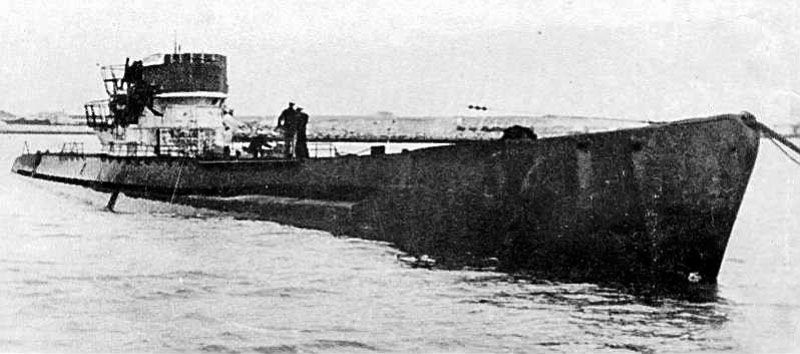
U-530's crew was probed about their potential complicity.

After Germany's surrender on 8 May 1945, the captain of U-530, then operating in the northern Atlantic Ocean, opted to surrender to the Argentine Navy in Mar del Plata, Buenos Aires Province, which occurred on 10 July. He was unable to explain why the voyage had taken two months nor the absence of usual documents. The Navy reported that no officers were aboard, while the police purportedly reported that Adolf Hitler and perhaps Eva Braun had been seen disembarking from a submarine. The captured U-boat and its crew were sent to North America, which did not discourage the U-977 from surrendering in Buenos Aires in mid-August in hopes of being sheltered. (Note: U-977's captain twice asserted in his 1952 book that U-530 arrived earlier than its surrender, even claiming that this occurred while Hitler was still alive.)

On 18 January 1946, Bishop Antonio Caggiano, leader of the Argentine chapter of Catholic Action, flew to Rome to be consecrated as cardinal by Pius XII. Both Caggiano and French cardinal Eugène Tisserant heavily interceded in helping Lescat and Daye and their associates emigrate from Spain to Argentina. In early 1946, Caggiano implored the Argentine consul in Rome to stamp the passports of three confirmed French war criminals (and five other Frenchmen) with Argentine tourist visas, regardless of missing return tickets and health certificates. The first documented case of a French war criminal arriving in Buenos Aires was Émile Dewoitine on 28 May 1946, after sailing first class on the same ship with Caggiano. (Note: In 1948, France sentenced Dewoitine in absentia to 20 years of hard labour.)

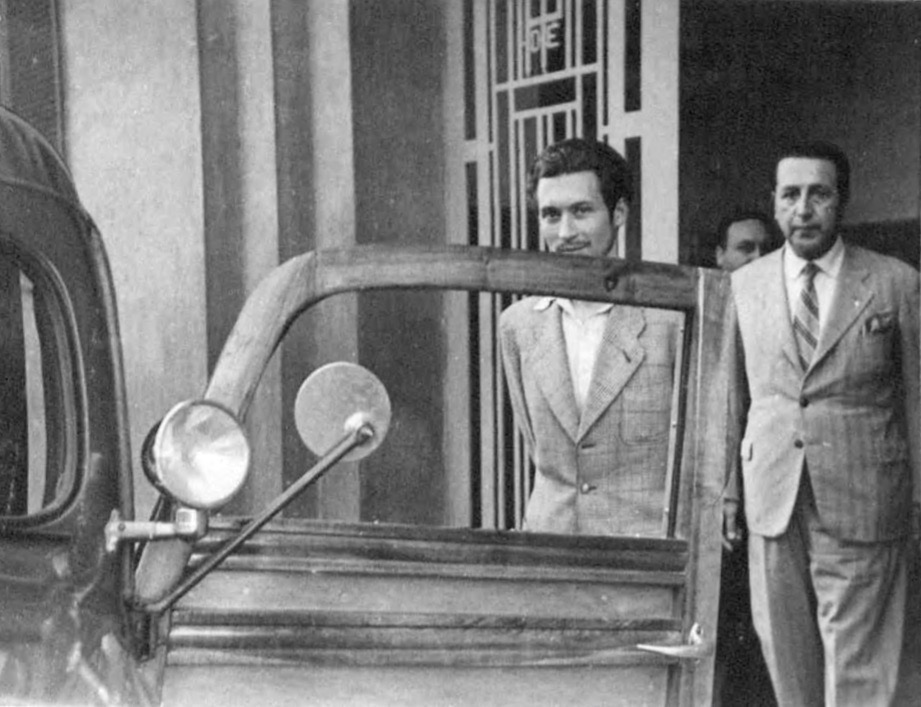
Juan Perón (right), Department 50 (Note: Many photographed subjects in Chile's anti-Nazi investigation demonstrate no awareness of a camera—possibly implying the use of hidden devices.)

==== Perón's Argentina ====
Reportedly aligned with Nazi intelligence, Ludwig Freude coordinated contributions from Nazi collaborators to Perón's 1946 presidential campaign. Perón appointed anthropologist Santiago Peralta (an avowed anti-Semite) as his immigration commissioner and Ludwig's son Rodolfo Freude as the head of the country's first intelligence bureau; the two Péron subordinates evidently aided European war criminals by streamlining their pathway to citizenship and employing them within their departments. Perón's regime collaborated with Draganović's ratline and provided at least 1 million Swiss francs (US$21.5 million, adjusted for inflation) to operate additional ratlines through Scandinavia and Switzerland. As many as 5,000 Nazi war criminals escaped to Argentina, some as late as 1950, the year Adolf Eichmann arrived. Perón later stated that he helped as many Nazi officials as possible in a reaction to the Nuremberg trials of Nazi war criminals (1945–1946), which he thought were a "disgrace".

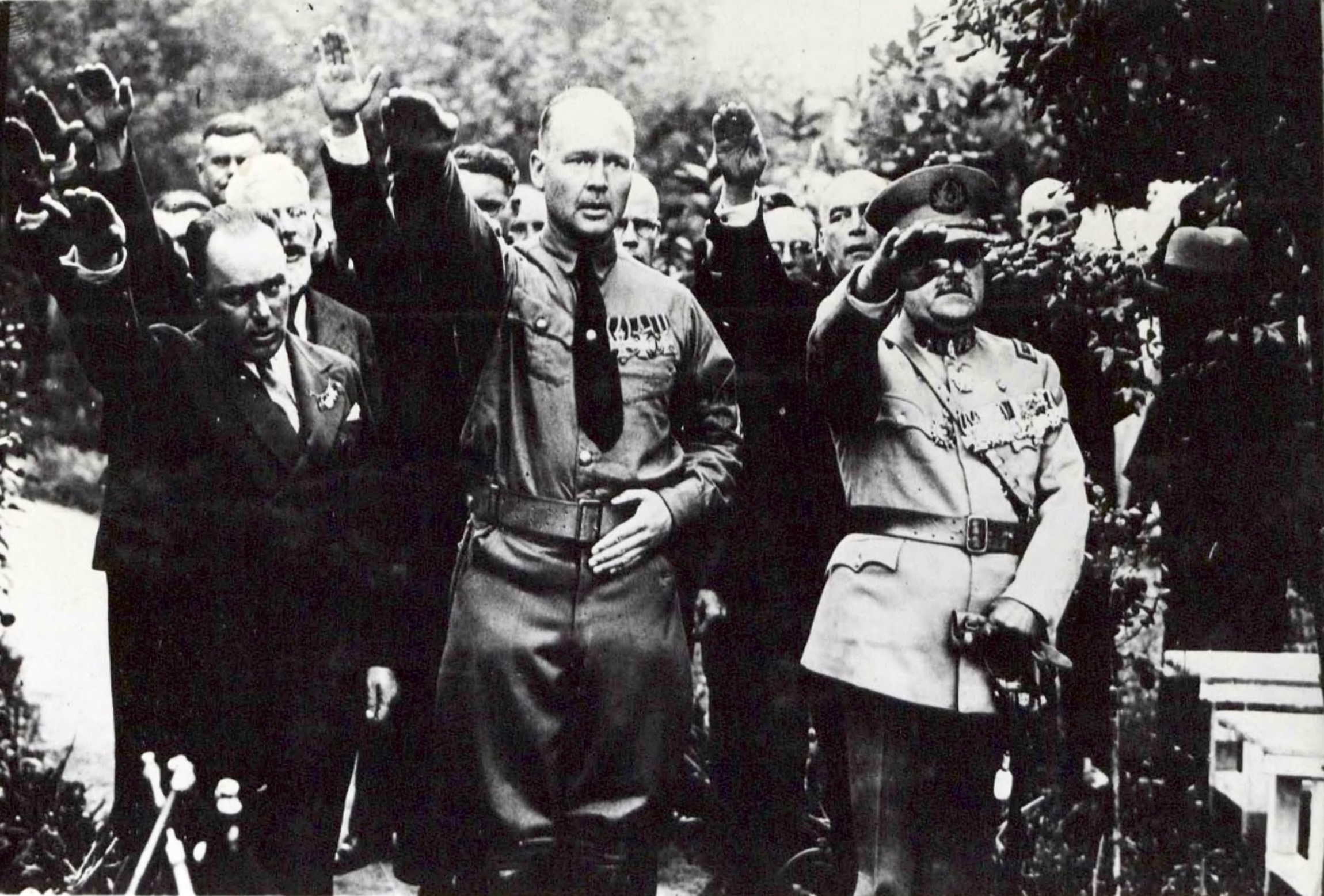
A man with a small toothbrush mustache performs a Hitleresque Nazi salute c. 1946 (from Dept. 50's final probe).

From the late 1940s to the 1950s, the U.S. Federal Bureau of Investigation (FBI) and Central Intelligence Agency (CIA) investigated reports that Hitler had not died in 1945, but escaped to South America – typically via Argentina, as the Soviets suggested after taking Berlin. The CIA even received a purported photograph of Hitler in Colombia in 1954. According to Western scholars, the dictator's 1945 death is proven by his confirmed dental remains and eyewitnesses – excluding the possibility of mandibulectomy and supporting deception. The FBI and CIA began declassifying relevant files in 1999 in accordance with the Nazi War Crimes Disclosure Act and started to publish them online c. 2011.

Additionally, the FBI supported Chilean police's Department 50 as it probed Nazi spy activity within its borders during the war. In its last outing (c. 1945–1947), Chile joined with other governments to probe Nazi activity in wider Latin America, dismantling networks in Argentina, Brazil, Colombia, and Venezuela. The Chilean police declassified numerous files and photographs in 2017.

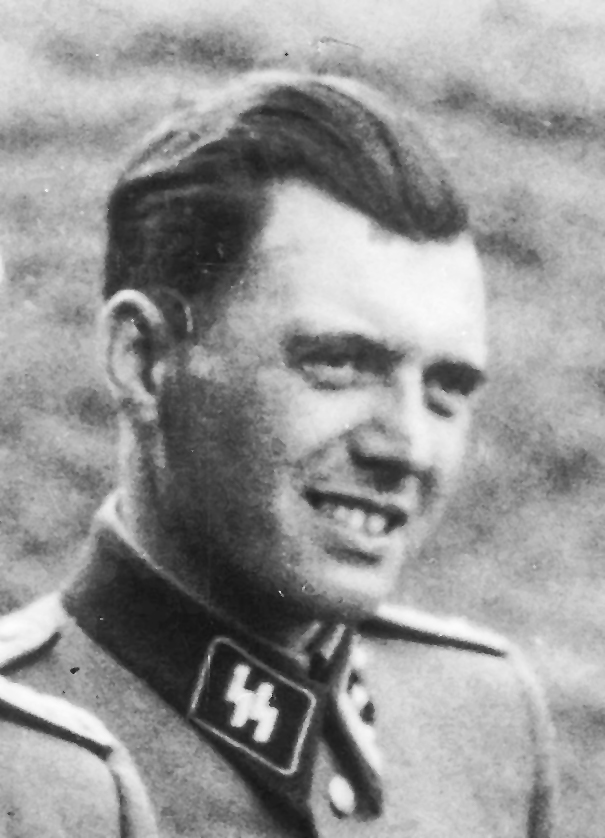
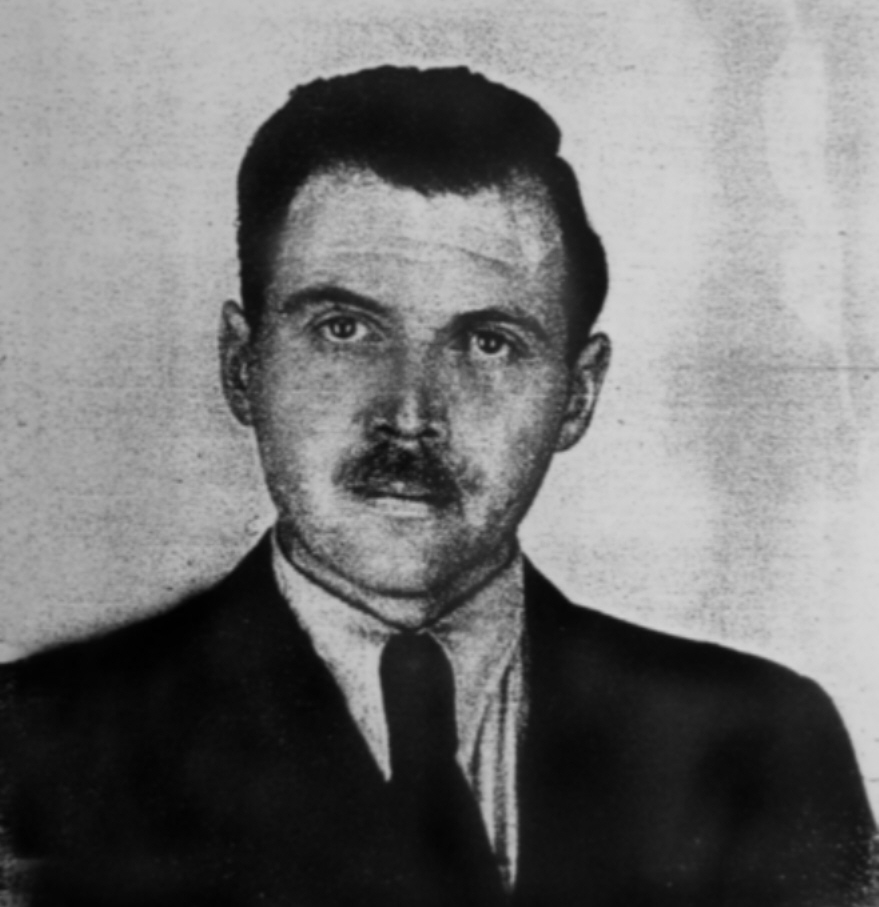
SS officer and experimenter upon Holocaust prisoners Josef Mengele (with a disguised identity below)

After entering Argentina under a false name, Josef Mengele (known as the "Angel of Death" due to his role in the Holocaust) reclaimed his surname in the mid-1950s to marry his brother's widow in Uruguay, then brought her to Argentina. In 1959, he used his real name to apply for a passport at the German embassy in Buenos Aires; the same year, West Germany unsuccessfully requested extradition. In 1960, Argentine officials noted, "it appears that, while maintaining his real name, [Mengele] belonged to the SS Society". However, by that year, he had fled to Paraguay (as noted by the Argentine police), and c. 1963 Brazilian authorities suspected his presence. He died in Brazil in 1979, with his remains identified via DNA analysis in 1992. In 2026, Swiss federal intelligence released files regarding Mengele and his possible, however unlikely, presence in its country c. 1960.

In 1992, Argentina's government declassified a voluminous file regarding Nazi escapees. In the mid-1990s, Argentine president Carlos Menem created a commission to investigate the country's Nazi past. Its initial 1998 report claimed that Argentina had only received 150–180 Nazi criminals. The Simon Wiesenthal Center (SWC) dismissed this quantity as far too low and noted a lack of disclosures regarding alleged deposits of Nazi gold into the Central Bank of Argentina.

In the 1990s, Credit Suisse investigated Jewish-held accounts that had been seized by the Nazis or stagnated after the killing of their owners. This led to a US$1.25 billion settlement in 1999, but the bank was accused of ignoring Nazi-tied accounts. Since 2020, the SWC and businessman Ronald Lauder (who estimates that an additional $5–10 billion was not released) have pushed Credit Suisse's owner, UBS, to cooperate with a renewed investigation of loot-derived funds. U.S. Senate Budget Committee heads Chuck Grassley (R) and Sheldon Whitehouse (D) launched an inquiry and in 2024, former U.S. prosecutor Neil Barofsky reported that he had "identified client documents and other evidence that demonstrate a significant connection between Credit Suisse and one of the key [escape] routes", specifically concerning "funds required to operate the ratline, including to pay for bribes, false identification documents, and transportation". The U.S. investigation revealed that some 890 Credit Suisse accounts were used by Nazis, including one for the German Red Cross and some for the Argentine immigration office in Bern, Switzerland, to which it rented an office; the bank also interacted significantly with the SS. (Note: The accounts consisted of 628 accounts for individuals and 262 for legal entities. Key operatives held accounts, probably used for bribes (with Barofsky naming the French and Swiss).) (Note: In February 2026, the Senate Judiciary Committee (which Grassley now chaired) held an interim hearing. UBS was questioned about its withholding of over 150 documents related to the 1999 settlement, with a spokesperson arguing that their release would result in lawsuits for further payments. UBS argued that the settlement satisfied all financial requirements regarding Nazi-affected accounts, despite the apparent omission of loot-derived funds from the 1990s probe (and the denial of the existence of an account for the SS's economic arm, now proven).) Argentine authorities paid European officials some US$22 million (adjusted for inflation) to facilitate the routes. The Senate hoped to conclude its inquiry by mid-2026, with Barofsky's final report expected by the end of the year. (Note: Further review could last much longer, with Barofsky comparing the bank's archives to the huge warehouse at the end of Raiders of the Lost Ark.) (Note: In May 2026, Grassley asked the Justice Department's special envoy to combat antisemitism to help probe UBS's potential obstruction, and in July, called on President Donald Trump to release any outstanding files related to the Nazi War Crimes Disclosure Act.)

In early 2025, Argentine president Javier Milei met with representatives from the SWC, who requested in conjunction with the Senate Judiciary Committee for cooperation in the latter's investigation of Credit Suisse's Nazi patronage. Late in April 2025, Argentina published 1,850 relevant documents online (many of which had been declassified in 1992). In May 2025, United Press International reported that these files indicate that the Nazis may have bribed Perón's government with US$200 million in gold, some of which was allegedly delivered via U-boat before being delivered to Eva Perón. The funds were reportedly handled by German "bankers" said to include Rodolfo Freude. (Note: Milei's administration provided additional documents, including some from Argentine arms manufacturer Fabricaciones Militares related to about US$64.5 million (2025 currency) spent from 1945 to 1950 to finance national defense research and secret missions to Europe to hire unknown "technical personnel".)

=== Role of U.S. intelligence ===
Although the CIC arrested Father Vilim Cecelja (who provided some Ustaše with false identities) in October 1945, the U.S. agency reportedly paid Draganović to help Soviet defectors escape, helping fund the flight of some Croatian nationalists from Europe (having become aware by late 1946 that he was sending war criminals wanted by British authorities to South America). The director of the Austria-based 430th CIC established a local ratline as early as 1945. The CIC is estimated to have aided the escapes of perhaps 70 Soviet defectors and informants—some of whom were former SS—to South America, as well as Klaus Barbie, whom the 430th began protecting in April 1947. In November 1947, ex-SS officer Karl Hass, who had assisted Hudal in helping Nazis flee Europe, was brought to Austria to aid the CIC in the anti-Soviet matter.

The 430th reported in 1950 that in mid-1947, the Army instructed them to begin using Draganović's Roman network to evacuate some people out of Austria, supported by a U.S. official at the International Refugee Organization (IRO). The directive applied to "visitors ... who had been in the custody of the 430th CIC ... and whose continued residence in Austria constituted a security threat as well as a source of possible embarrassment to the Commanding General" of the regional U.S. Forces. The CIC secured assistance from Draganović, whom they knew operated "several clandestine evacuation channels to the various South American countries for various types of European refugees". Draganović selected escapees from the American occupation zone in Germany, most likely including Ustaše war criminals.

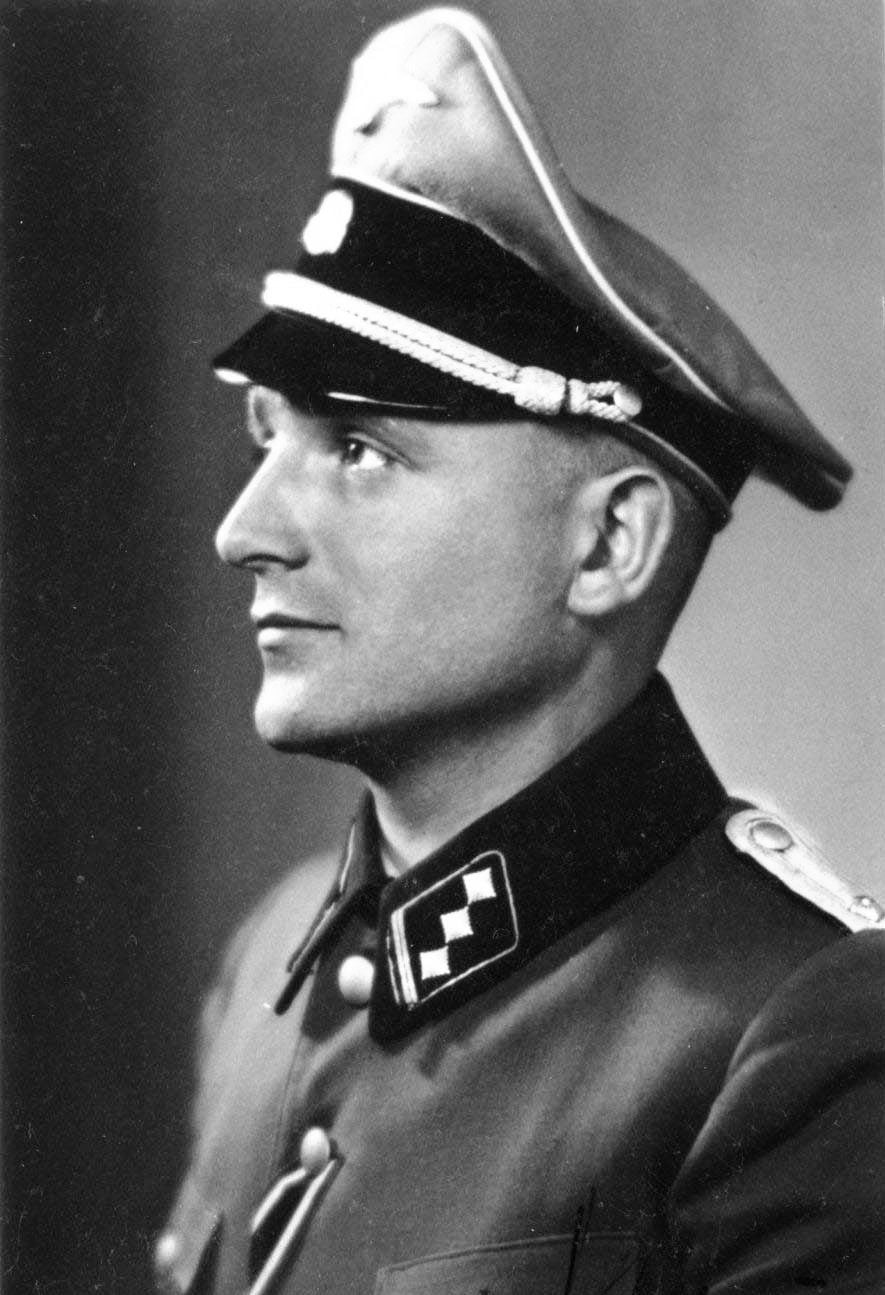
SS-Obersturmführer Klaus Barbie

Klaus Barbie gave the CIC access to knowledge about the French occupation zone in Germany, the Communist Party of Germany, and former SS officers. Meanwhile, he learned about the Austria-based Document Disposal Unit (DDU), a U.S. State Department intelligence unit led by CIA director Allen Dulles and staffed with Office of Strategic Services (OSS) men, also sometimes operating as War Department or OSS entities. The French pressed the U.S. to find and extradite Barbie. Fearing that France may have fallen to communism and wanted to extract CIC intel from Barbie (but also possibly due to embarrassment about having recruited him), the State Department claimed that he could not be found in the U.S. Zone of Austria, and by 1951, facilitated his escape via the Roman ratline, for which Draganović was reimbursed. According to the CIC, Draganović charged the following fees for his role in the escapes: US$500 per child, US$1,000 per adult, US$1,400 for a very important person and over US$1,500 for individuals older than 60. This ratline was reinforced by the DDU, which aimed to eliminate French and British control. Barbie settled in Bolivia and spent 33 years there before his arrest. In the early 1980s, a former CIC official was quoted as saying that "Barbie was the only Nazi we took out [of Europe]." (Note: The CIC employed some former SS men during the early Cold War, in some cases enabling their escapes within Europe or to South America.) (Note: Following the 1945 disappearance of Holocaust enactor Heinrich Müller, the CIA voiced support for both his possible death in Berlin and alleged defection to the Soviet Union (which the agency accused of spreading rumors about Müller escaping to the West). Although neither government's archives demonstrate knowledge of his fate, an alleged CIC dossier circulated in 1988 claims that it retained Müller, who allegedly asserted that Hitler escaped using a body double. Western historians of Hitler's death dismiss the dossier as sensational.)

After June 1951, the 430th was no longer responsible for aiding ratline escapees, which the CIA was then slated to perform. In 1954, the CIA sent former SS officer Otto von Bolschwing, who had provided intelligence since 1945, to the U.S., convincing the Immigration and Naturalization Service that there were no known grounds for his inadmissability. Additionally, SS officer Tscherim Soobzokov, who had enlisted as a CIA spy early in the Cold War to gain intel from Soviet-aligned contacts in the Middle East, moved to the U.S. and later worked for the FBI.

== Ratline escapees ==
Notable Nazis and war criminals who escaped using the ratlines include:

- Andrija Artuković (Ustaše official) entered the U.S. as a tourist c. 1948. After decades of overstaying his visa and resulting legal battles, he was arrested in 1984 and extradited to SFR Yugoslavia in 1986, where he died in prison in 1988.
- Klaus Barbie (SS officer) was sheltered by the CIC from April 1947 and fled to Bolivia in 1951 with help from the U.S. In 1983, he was extradited to France, where he died in prison in 1991.
- Alois Brunner (SS officer) fled to Syria, where he died perhaps as late as 2010.
- László Csatáry (Nazi collaborator) fled to Canada. His citizenship was stripped in 1997 and he fled, but was placed under house arrest in 2012. He died the next year while awaiting trial.
- Herberts Cukurs (Nazi collaborator) fled to Brazil by 1946. He was assassinated by Mossad agents in Uruguay in 1965.
- Léon Degrelle (SS officer) intended to flee to South America in 1945, but his escape plane crashed at the Spain rendezvous. He was detained, but fled his hospital in 1946 while recovering. He died in Spain in 1994.
- Eugen Dollmann (SS officer) collaborated with the CIC and escaped to Spain.
- Adolf Eichmann (SS officer) fled to Argentina in 1950. He was captured in 1960 and executed in Israel on 1 June 1962.
- Hans Fischböck (Nazi collaborator) escaped to Argentina before returning to Europe under amnesty
- Aribert Heim (SS doctor) fled Germany in 1962 and most likely died in Egypt in 1992.
- Friedrich Kadgien (Nazi collaborator) escaped with loot to Switzerland in 1945, later going to Brazil and around 1950 Buenos Aires, where he died in 1978.
- Olavi Karpalo (SS volunteer) fled to Venezuela c. 1945, dying there in 1988.
- Michael Kast (NSDAP member, army soldier) fled to Chile in 1950 and died there in 2014.
- Aarne Kauhanen (Nazi collaborator) fled to Venezuela c. 1945. He was arrested in 1947 and died in 1949.
- Reinhard Kopps (Nazi intelligence officer) fled to Argentina and was able to support neo-Nazi groups in Germany. He was exposed by the SWC in the early 1990s.
- Josef Mengele (SS officer) fled to Argentina in 1949, then to Paraguay around 1960 and then Brazil, where he drowned after suffering a stroke in 1979.
- Arvid Ojasti (Nazi collaborator) fled to Norway in 1945, then Sweden, and finally Venezuela. In December 1963, he was shot and killed under unclear circumstances.
- Ante Pavelić (founder of the Ustaše) escaped to Argentina in 1948, surviving an assassination attempt in 1957, then moved to Spain, where he died from his wounds.
- Erich Priebke (SS officer) fled to Argentina c. 1948 and was arrested there in 1994. In 2013, he died at the age of 100 during his house arrest in Rome.
- Walter Rauff (SS officer) fled to Ecuador then Chile, where he was shielded by dictator Augusto Pinochet and where he died in 1984.
- Eduard Roschmann (SS officer) escaped to Argentina in 1948, then to Paraguay, where he died in 1977.
- Hans-Ulrich Rudel (Nazi pilot) fled to Argentina in 1948 and aided other fugitives. He later moved to Paraguay and died in Germany in 1982.
- Dinko Šakić (Ustaše official) fled to Spain then Argentina in 1947. He was arrested in 1998 and extradited to Croatia. He was sentenced to 20 years in prison for war crimes and crimes against humanity. He died in 2008.
- Josef Schwammberger (SS officer) fled to Argentina in 1948 and lived under his real name and obtained citizenship. Arrested in 1987, he was eventually extradited to West Germany in 1990, and sentenced to life imprisonment in 1992. He died in prison in 2004.
- Friedrich Schwend (SS officer) collaborated with the CIC, escaped to South America, and emigrated to Peru in 1949 before returning to Germany in 1958.
- Otto Skorzeny (SS officer) escaped an internment camp in 1948 and fled to Spain. He made many trips to Argentina, serving as a bodyguard for Eva Perón. He died in Spain in 1975.
- Boris Smyslovsky (Nazi collaborator) fled to Argentina in 1948 from neutral Liechtenstein, where he later returned and died in 1988.
- Franz Stangl (SS officer) fled to Syria in 1948 then Brazil in 1951. He was arrested in 1967 and extradited to West Germany, where he died in 1971.
- Ludolf von Alvensleben (SS officer) fled to Argentina c. 1946. Although Poland sentenced him to death in absentia, he evaded justice by remaining in Argentina until his death in 1970.
- Gustav Wagner (SS officer) fled to Brazil in 1950 and was arrested there in 1978. The country refused to extradite him and he committed suicide in 1980.

== In popular culture ==
Fictional works about the ratlines include a novel by Stuart Neville and stories based on Hitler's alleged escape, the hypothetical ODESSA organization and/or the Fourth Reich. They also inspired the revived Galactic Empire (led by a resurrected Palpatine, a villain largely modeled on Hitler) in the Star Wars sequel trilogy (2015–2019).

== See also ==
- CEDADE – Spanish neo-Nazi group
- Die Spinne – Alleged organisation that aided SS fugitives
- Martin Bormann § Survival rumors
- Nazism in the Americas
- Otto Wächter – Austrian Nazi lawyer and politician (1901–1949)
- U.S. intelligence involvement with German and Japanese war criminals after World War II
- War criminals in Canada
