= Hans Fischböck =

Austrian banker and Nazi official

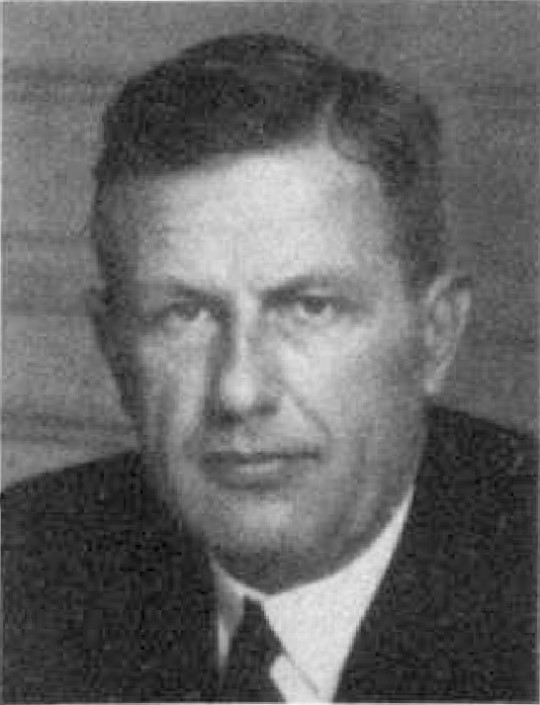
Hans Fischböck

Hans Fischböck (24 January 1895 – 3 July 1967) was an Austrian banker who was the economics minister and minister of finance of Austria and the finance minister of Nazi-occupied Netherlands. He escaped to Argentina after World War II, only returning to Europe after the granting of a general amnesty.

He was born in Geras, Austria, and studied in Vienna. From 1915 to 1918 he served in the Austro-Hungarian Army during the First World War and was deployed to the front in the south of the County of Tyrol. After the war, he gained a doctor of law degree in Vienna in 1919 and then worked in the Austrian banking system.

In March 1938, after the Anschluss of Austria by Germany, Fischböck was appointed economics minister and, in May 1938, he was appointed minister of finance and took measures for the expropriation of Jewish property. At the April 1938 parliamentary election, he was elected as a deputy to the Reichstag from Ostmark and retained this seat until the fall of the Nazi regime. After the invasion of the Netherlands, Arthur Seyss-Inquart appointed him minister of finance of the occupied Netherlands and he served in this capacity from 1940 to 1945. From March 1941, he was involved in the expropriation of Jewish property and sending forced laborers to Germany to work in the arms industry.

After the German capitulation, Fischböck managed to escape to Argentina. In Austria, a prosecution was brought against him but a conviction was not secured and in 1957 his acts fell under an amnesty. In 1958, he returned to Europe and he died in Marburg, Germany, in 1967.
