= Petter Forsström =

Finnish politician (1877–1967)

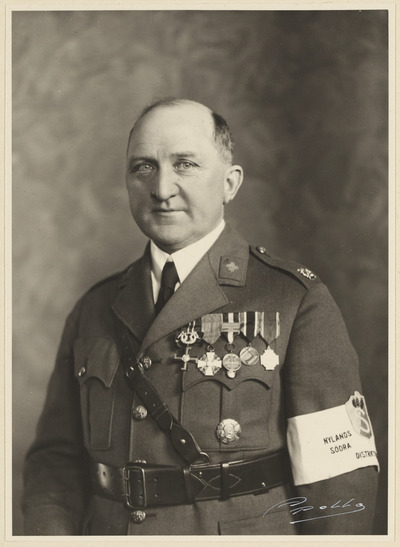
Forsström in White Guard uniform

Petter Teodor Forsström (7 November 1877 Särkisalo – 13 November 1967 Lohja) was a Finnish industrialist, Vuorineuvos and the father of the Lohja lime industry. Forsström worked as Lohjan Kalkkitehdas Oy's (Lohja Lime Factory Ltd) managing director for an exceptionally long period of time, 65 years. In 1946 he was sentenced to six years in prison for treason after participating in the pro-German resistance movement during the Lapland War after the Finnish government had switched sides and organizing the ratlines.

== Career ==
Forsström served as the managing director of Lohjan Kalkkitehdas Oy, founded by his father, for a record long period, from 1897 to 1962. During this time the company built the Virkkala lime factory in 1897 and in 1919 also a cement factory. The company was listed on the stock exchange from 1924 until its merger with Wärtsilä in 1990. Forsström established a hospital operated by the company and invested heavily in staff housing and well-being. In 1962, he announced his retirement as follows: "In Finland, 65 years is the general retirement age. Now that I have been 65 years as CEO, I ask to retire." He remained a board member until his death. Forsström's last project was the deep harbor in Ingå, which began to be built in the late 1960s.

Petter Forsström, known by the nickname Lime-Petteri, was also creating Lohjan Sähkö Oy (Lohja Electricity Ltd), and in 1927 the Lohja Engineering School was born on his initiative. Forsström was one of General CGE Mannerheim's friends and hunting companions. In the autumn of 1939, Forsström equipped Finland's only private anti-aircraft cannon to protect his factories and Lohja.

== Political opinions and treason ==
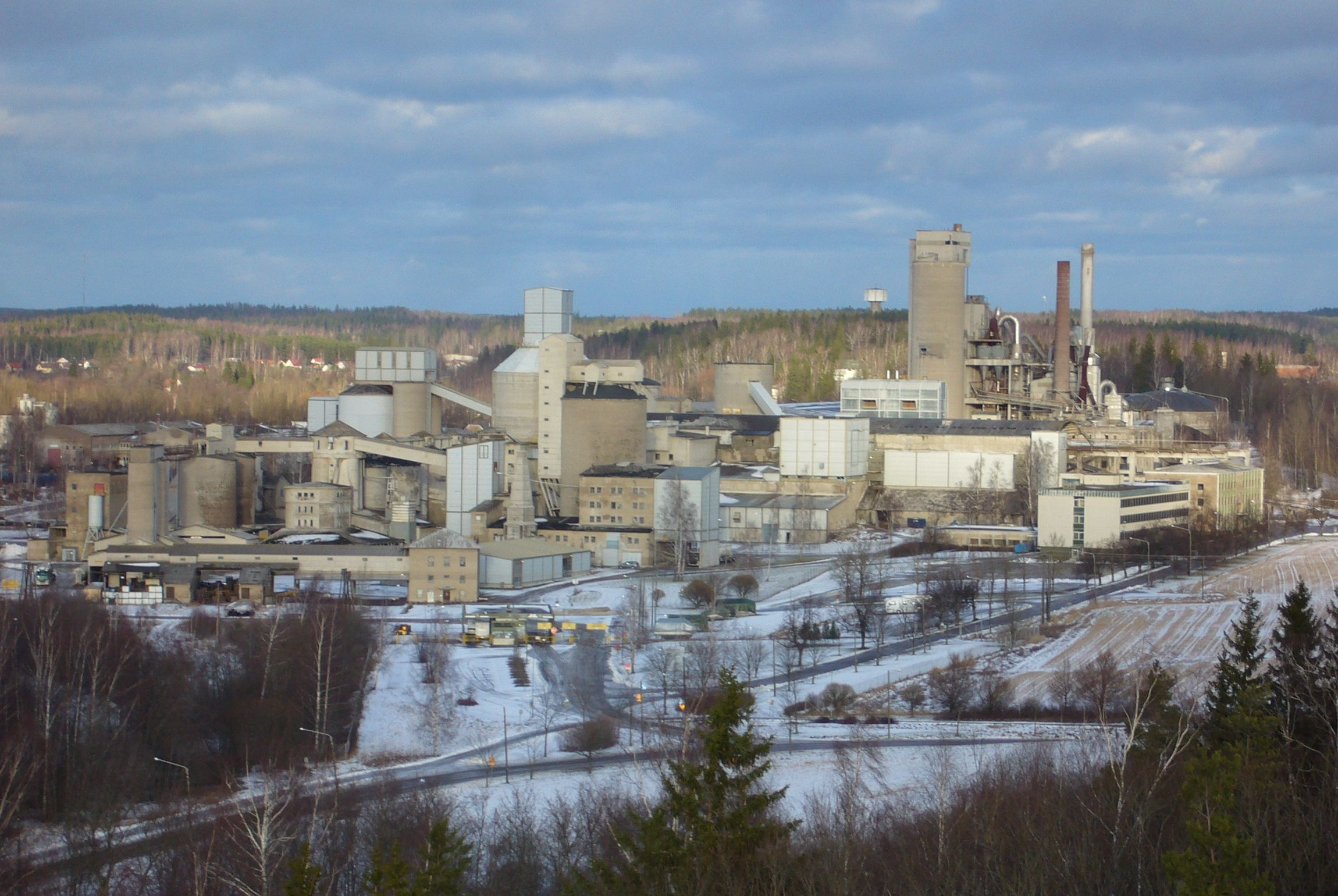
Virkkala limestone- and cement factory

Politically, Forsström can be described as extremely right wing. He was one of the business representatives who personally, through his company or through business organizations, financially assisted the Lapua movement in its various stages. He was a founder of the Lapua movement's predecessor, Suomen Lukko. Forsström served on the governing bodies of the Lapua Movement, which were formed in the autumn of 1930.

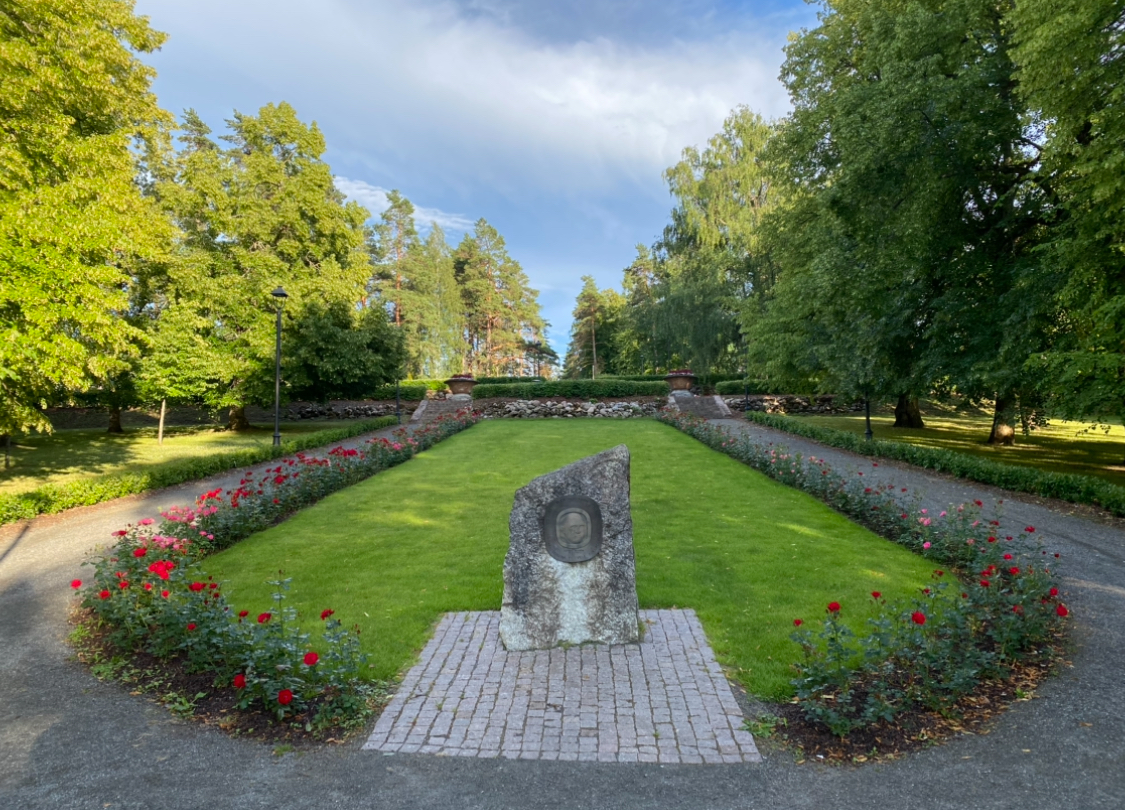
Memorial of Forsström in the park named after him in Lohja

Unlike several other entrepreneurs and business leaders for whom the Lapua movement's achievements in defeating communism were sufficient, Forsström subsequently expressed even more radical far-right views. Forsström's circle of acquaintances included several Finnish fascist and National Socialist figures, including Bertel Gripenberg, Johan Christian Fabritius, Arvi Kalsta and Yrjö Raikas. Forsström funded the Nazi Kansallissosialisti newspaper edited by Raikas and the Nazi People's Community Society's För Frihet och Rätt magazine.

In the early 1940s, Forsström described his company Lohjan Kalkkitehdas Oy as "a national socialist community in the middle of a liberal democratic system".

In the final stages of the Continuation War, as the break in Finnish-Nazi relations approached as Finland sought peace with the Soviet Union, Forsström participated in a meeting organized by the German intelligence service Sicherheitsdienst, or SD, in August 1944, where a pro-German resistance movement was established in Finland. Forsström contributed to the organisation's activities by, inter alia, purchasing motor boats for transport to Sweden. Following the exposure of the organisation, Forsström received a six-year sentence, half of which he served and was stripped of his "civic confidence" (kansalaisluottamus) and deprived of his right to take part in the political process after his release.

In honor of his 70th birthday, Forsström was allowed to visit his home in Lohja. About 250 people attended the birthday party, including Marshal Mannerheim.

While in prison, Forsström raised funds to establish a vocational school for young prisoners in Riihimäki. The vocational school began operations in 1949. He also began systematically employing released prisoners. Among them were fellow Nazis, such as Arno Anthoni.

In 1952, Forsström, while still lacking his "civic confidence", was awarded the title of Commander of the Order of the Lion of Finland.

== Sources ==
- Niilo Lappalainen: Aselevon jälkeen. WSOY, 1997. ISBN 951-0-21813-8
