= Otto Brusiin =

Finnish law professor

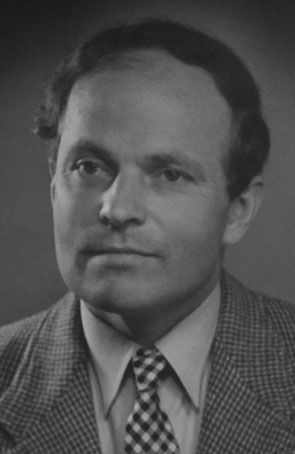
Otto Brusiin

Otto Brusiin (2 June 1906 – 31 October 1973) was a leading Finnish teacher of law. He taught at Helsinki from 1949 on before he was made assistant professor at Helsinki in 1955 and professor at Turku in 1961. He served as the director of the Valpo from April 1945 to January 1946.

Recorded to have been a stirring teacher, Brusiin was also widely connected abroad. In 1957, he was made first vice president of the International Association of Legal and Social Philosophy. The focus of his work was on legal history and Roman law. His thought was influenced by modern philosophical anthropology and a sociological interpretation of law. For Brusiin, a legal norm can only be understood as a part of the society that produced it.

Brusiin was the father of Kaarina Suonio, who was Finland's minister of education from 1982 to 1986.
