= Johan Christian Fabritius =

Finnish lieutenant colonel

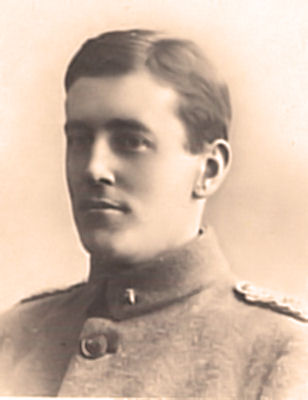
- Born: 29 May 1890; Moscow, Russian Empire
- Died: 2 November 1946 (aged 56) Helsinki, Finland
- Allegiance: Russia; Finland; Nazi Germany
- Service years: 1902–1912; 1914–1946
- Conflicts: World War I; Eastern Front; Finnish Civil War; World War II; Winter War; Continuation War; Lapland War

Johan Christian Sergei Fabritius (29 May 1890 – 2 November 1946) was a Finnish military lieutenant colonel.

He received his military training mainly in St. Petersburg and served during the First World War in the Russian engineering troops and participated in several battles in East Prussia, the Carpathians and Galicia. In 1917 he came to Finland and became chief of police in Rauma. In 1918, he commanded the White Guard on Åland and was later battalion commander in Satakunta.

In 1919 he was head of the fortifications department of the Ministry of War and from 1935 to 1938 acting head of the general staff's fortification department. He planned a large part of the fortifications that were built on the eastern border, Ladoga and the coast of the Gulf of Finland during the interwar period. That is why he has been called "the father of the Mannerheim line".

Fabritius was politically active in the Finnish-Swedish National Socialist circles before and during World War II. After Finland's armistice with the Soviet Union, in January 1945 he made a trip with a submarine to Germany. Lauri Törni was in same submarine. After negotiations with Ernst Kaltenbrunner between 10 and 11 February, he flew back and parachuted on 21 February. After being captured by the Red State Police, he died under observation in hospital, while awaiting prosecution on charges of treason.

== Books ==
- Fortifikation. Schildts, Helsinki 1921, Finnish title Linnoitustaito (fortifikatio). Otava 1921.
- Ställningars befästande och fältbefästningsarbeten : handledning för armén och skyddskåren. Officerens handbibliotek 12. Schildts, Helsinki 1922, Finnish title Asemien linnoittaminen ja kenttälinnoitustyöt : ohjeita armeijalle ja suojeluskunnille. Otava 1922.
- Pioniärteknikens användning i krig. Helsinki 1924, Finnish title Pionieeritekniikan käyttö sodassa. Otava 1924.
- Mitt vittnesmål: minnen från ostfronten 1914–1917. Söderström, Helsinki 1932.
- Män som inte glömma. Söderström, Helsinki 1936, Finnish title Miehiä, jotka eivät unohda: novel. Otava 1938.
- Barndom kring sekelskiftet. Söderström, Helsinki 1945.

== Sources ==
- Cronwall, Marjatta: Patriootin kuolema eli miten dokumentti ns. suuresta vakoilujutusta syntyi. tutkiva.fi. 22 March 2000. Tutkivan journalismin yhdistys. Archived 13 January 2006. Accessed 21 March 2020.
- Pohjonen, Juha: Maanpetturin tie: maanpetoksesta Suomessa vuosina 1945-1972 tuomitut. Helsinki: Otava, 2000. ISBN 951-1-16994-7.
- Salo, Paavo: "Sonderkommando Nord" – tapahtumat Kristiinassa ja Närpiössä Blogi. 2005. Salo, Paavo. Archived 10 August 2016. Accessed 21 March 2020.
- Uitto, Antero & Geust, Carl-Fredrik: Mannerheim-linja: Talvisodan legenda. Ajatus Kirjat, 2006. ISBN 951-20-7042-1.
- Harjula, Mirko: Itämeri 1914-1921: Itämeren laivastot maailmansodassa sekä Venäjän vallankumouksissa ja sisällissodassa. Helsinki: Books on Demand, 2010. ISBN 978-952-49838-3-9.
- Uola, Mikko: Unelma kommunistisesta Suomesta 1944–1953. Helsinki: Minerva Kustannus Oy, 2013. ISBN 978-952-492-768-0.
- Silvennoinen, Oula & Tikka, Marko & Roselius, Aapo: Suomalaiset fasistit: mustan sarastuksen airuet. Helsinki: WSOY, 2016. ISBN 9789510401323.
