= Einsatzkommando Finnland =

Einsatzkommando Finnland was a German paramilitary unit active in northern Finland and northern Norway during World War II, while Finland was fighting against the Soviet Union with the support of Nazi Germany. The official name of the unit was Einsatzkommando der Sicherheitspolizei und des SD beim AOK Norwegen, Befehlsstelle Finnland, but it was often referred to as Einsatzkommando Finnland.

The existence of Einsatzkommando Finnland, until then unknown, was revealed in a 2008 doctoral dissertation by Oula Silvennoinen. The unit was subordinated to Reichssicherheitshauptamt, and Finnish security police Valpo as well as a Finnish military intelligence organization collaborated with it.

== Background ==
It has previously been revealed in several studies, including that of investigative journalist Elina Sana in her book Luovutetut. Suomen ihmisluovutukset Gestapolle ("The Extradited. Finland's Extraditions to the Gestapo"), that during the Continuation War roughly 3,000 POWs and civilians were extradited to Germany in exchange for Finno-Ugric Soviet POWs held by Germany. Sana's book led to the ongoing research project at the Finnish National Archives. Most of those extradited joined the Russian Liberation Army or were recruited to spy behind the Soviet lines, but 520 of them were political officers in the Red Army or otherwise active communists, and although they were presumed killed in German hands, their exact fates had been unknown.

== Research ==
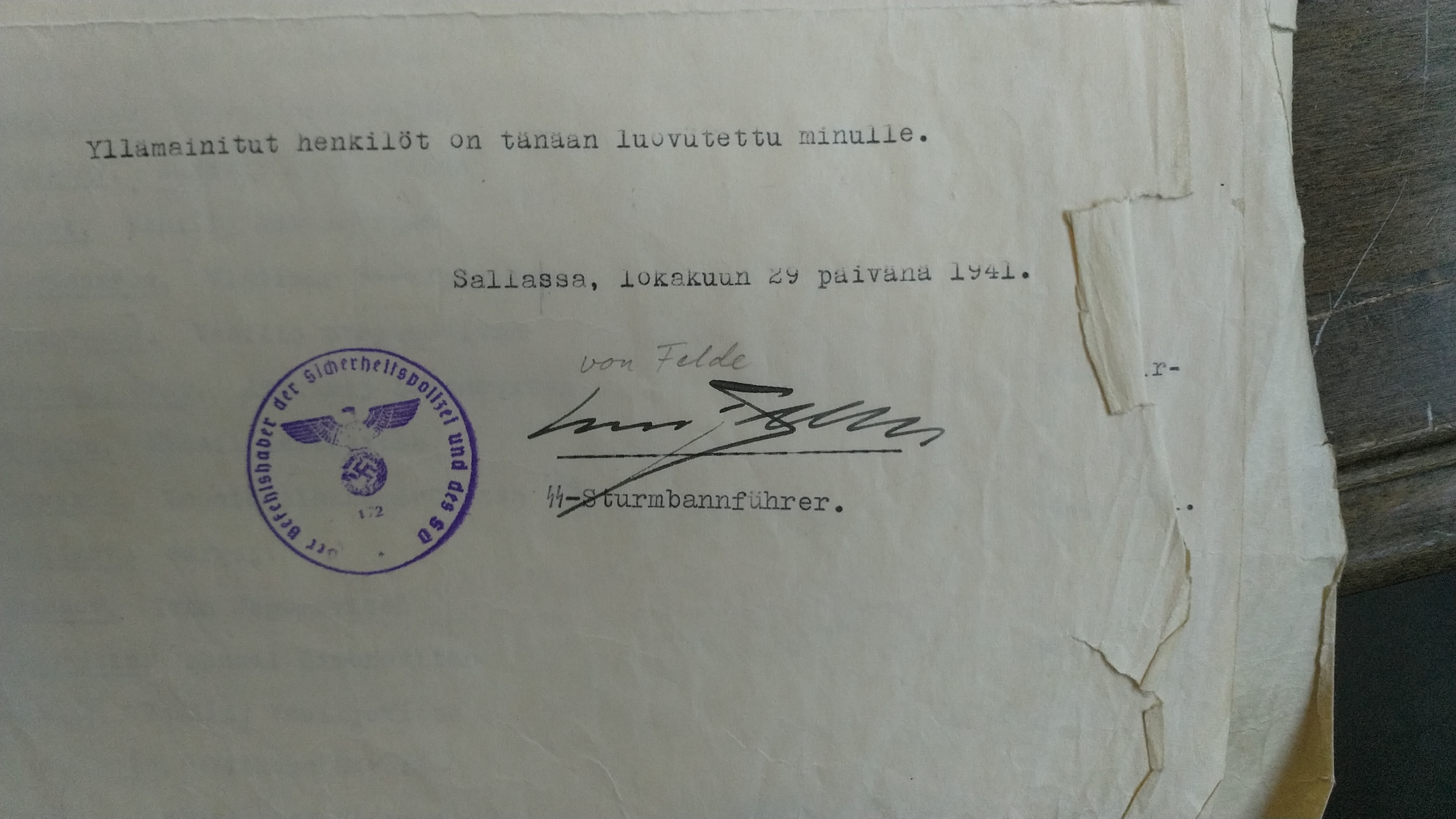
SS Sturmbannfuhrer von Felde signature ("The above individuals have been handed over to me today"

According to Silvennoinen's research, before and during the Continuation War Finland handed over about 500 POWs and refugees to Germans operating in Northern Finland and Northern Norway, who probably executed all of them. About 10% of those handed over were Jewish, although their ethnicity seems not to have been the reason for their extradition. Extraditions began in the summer of 1940. Additionally, a small number of Valpo officials worked as interpreters and interrogators in German POW camps with German Einsatzkommando Finnland officials, and were complicit in the executions of an unknown number of POWs.

Einsatzkommando Finnland operated in two POW camps, Stalag 322 in Elvenes, Norway and Stalag 309 in Salla, Finland (nowadays Russia). As the German advance into the Soviet Union stalled, the stream of POWs into these camps slowed to a trickle, and Einsatzkommando Finnland was disbanded at the end of 1942.

Silvennoinen is a researcher at the Finnish National Archives, and his dissertation forms a part of ongoing research on prisoner-of-war deaths in Finland and people handed over to Germany and the Soviet Union by Finnish authorities between 1939 and 1955.

== See also ==
- Einsatzgruppen
