= Arno Anthoni =

Finnish lawyer and Nazi collaborator (1900–1961)

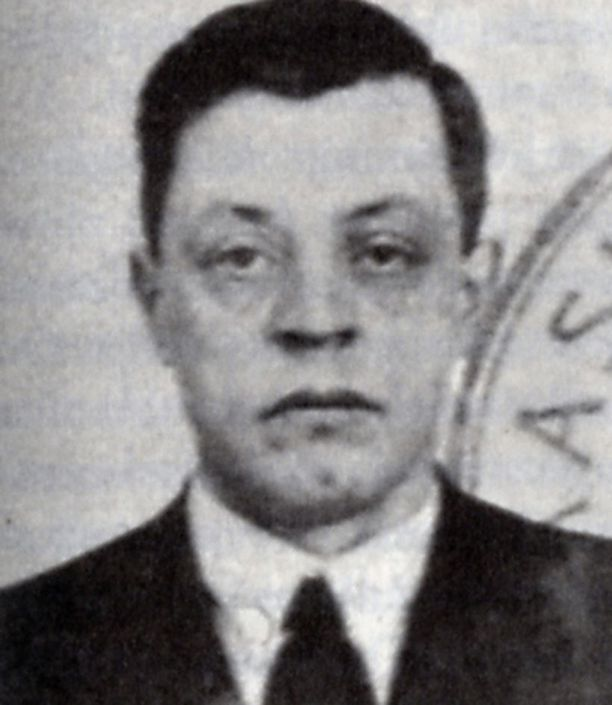

Director of the State Police of Finland
- In office 1 February 1941 – 1 March 1944
- Preceded by: Paavo Säippä
- Succeeded by: Paavo Kastari

Personal details
- Born: 11 August 1900 Karjalohja, Grand Duchy of Finland
- Died: 9 August 1961 (aged 60) Helsinki, Finland
- Education: University of Helsinki (M.L.)

Arno Kalervo Anthoni (11 August 1900 – 9 August 1961) was a Finnish lawyer who was director of the Finnish State Police (Valpo) in 1941–1944. He was openly antisemitic and pro-Nazi, having close relations to the German Sicherheitspolizei. Anthoni and the Minister of Interior Toivo Horelli were responsible for the deportation of 135 German refugees, including 12 Jews, from Finland to Nazi Germany in 1941–1943.

== Career ==
=== Early years ===
Anthoni was born in Karjalohja to the family of the lawyer Väinö Ossian Anthoni (1868–1933). After graduating with a Master of Laws degree from the University of Helsinki in 1927, Anthoni worked as a lensmann (Finnish: nimismies) in the Kymenlaakso region. In 1933, he was appointed police director of Uusimaa Province.

=== Wartime ===
In February 1941, Anthoni became the director of the State Police. As Finland joined World War II on the side of Germany with the outbreak of the Continuation War in June 1941, Germany started pressing the Finnish government to deport German refugees who had fled to Finland after 1938.

In April 1942, Anthoni visited Berlin where he met Heinrich Müller, Friedrich Panzinger and Adolf Eichmann to discuss the "Final Solution" concerning the Jews of Finland. The Gestapo asked them to be handed over to the German authorities, to which Anthoni reacted positively. He made a verbal agreement to expel all German refugees Finland saw as an "unwanted element". The agreement also included Soviet POWs of Jewish origin.

Although the Finnish government refused transferring its own Jewish citizens, Anthoni's trip caused a mass deportation of "disagreeable aliens" in June 1942. Among the deported were two German-born Jews. The matter was also discussed on Heinrich Himmler's visit to Finland in the late summer of 1942. The Minister of Interior Toivo Horelli and Anthoni soon made a classified decision on the deportation of 27 refugees, of whom 8 were Jews. On 8 November 1942, the deported were shipped to Tallinn in German-occupied Estonia and handed over to the Gestapo. According to the documents found in the Estonian state archives, the Jews were killed just two days later. The intention was to deport all Jewish refugees, but knowledge of the plan soon spread. After the intervention of the Social Democratic cabinet members Väinö Tanner and K.-A. Fagerholm, further deportations were stopped.

In late 1942, Anthoni asked Horelli to make a requisition for awarding the SS commander Martin Sandberger with the Order of the White Rose of Finland. Sandberger was the commander of the Sicherheitspolizei and Sicherheitsdienst in Estonia.

=== After the war ===
As it was clear that Germany was going to lose the war, Anthoni was dismissed in March 1944. After the Moscow Armistice he fled to Sweden, but was soon returned to Finland. Anthoni was arrested in the Ostrobothnian village of Rautio in April 1945, and put into preventive detention.

Anthoni never faced the Finnish war-responsibility trials. Poland and the Western Allies wanted Anthoni, Horelli and the State Police officer Ari Kauhanen to be included on the list of war criminals, but the Soviet Union never made a claim to the Finnish government. This was most likely because the Soviets focused on people who had committed war crimes against their own citizens.

In early 1948, Anthoni was put on trial for misconduct, accused of the transfer of 76 German refugees to the Gestapo between 1942 and 1943. Anthoni claimed to have no idea of what would happen to the Jews, and that the deported were chosen by Horelli. In reality, Horelli had given him complete freedom to make decisions on his own. As the Allied Commission left Finland in May 1948, Anthoni, who still denied knowledge what would happen to the Jews, was released. The case went to the Supreme Court which dismissed the indictment in February 1949. Anthoni was only given an admonition for negligent misconduct. He received compensation for the three years that he spent in pre-trial custody. Part of his reason for his acquittal was that Georg Kollmann, the sole survivor of the deportations, who lost his wife and child, forgave Anthoni and asked that he not be punished. Kollmann, who later denied having forgiven Anthoni, was regarded by Finnish Jews as a traitor for helping Anthoni evade consequences.

Anthoni worked his last years as a lawyer for the mineral company Oy Lohja Ab, owned by the prominent Finnish Nazi Petter Forsström, who had served time in prison for treason after being convicted of participation in the pro-German resistance movement during the Lapland War after Finland had switched sides. He died at the Malmi Hospital in Helsinki.

== See also ==
- Never Alone (film)
