= Aarne Kauhanen =

Finnish military officer and war liaison (1909–1949)

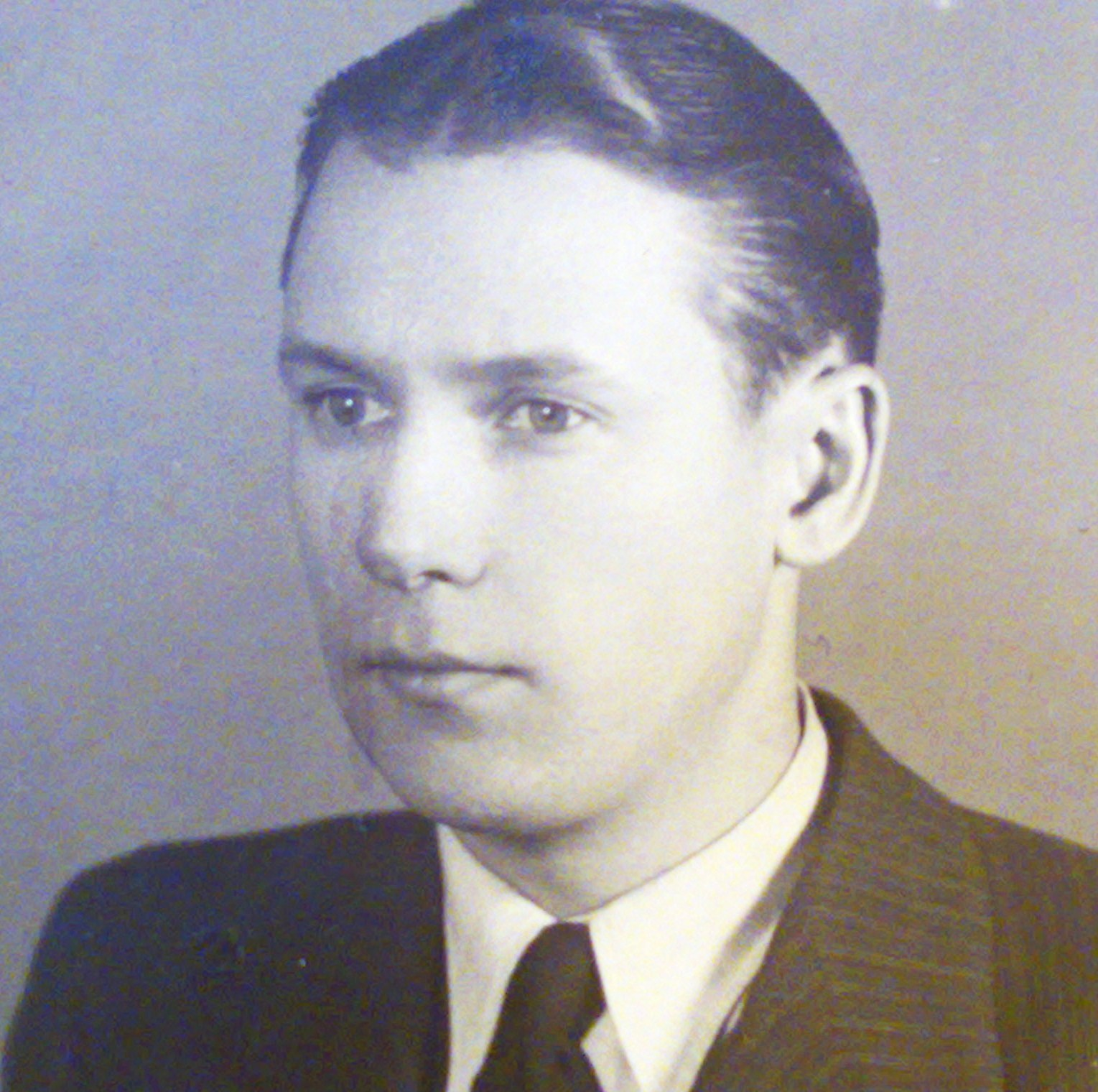
- Kauhanen in c. 1934
- Born: Aarne Emil Kauhanen; 29 November 1909; Helsinki, Grand Duchy of Finland, Russian Empire
- Died: 11 October 1949 (aged 39); Venezuela
- Cause of death: Assassination by gunshot
- Military career
- Allegiance: Finland
- Branch: Central Detective Police; State Police
- Service years: 1933–1944
- Nickname: Kuha
- Conflicts: Winter War; Continuation War

Aarne Emil Kauhanen (29 November 1909 – 11 October 1949) was a Finnish officer of the Central Detective Police (EK) and its successor, the State Police (Valpo), with special responsibility for aliens in the 1930s and 1940s. During the Continuation War, Kauhanen acted as a liaison between the Finnish and Nazi German police authorities and was involved in the recruitment of the Finnish SS Battalion. He also beat and tortured Jewish refugees during interrogations. After the war, Kauhanen escaped to South America, where he died in unclear circumstances in 1949. According to a memoir, one of his victims recognized and later shot him.

== Life ==
=== Early years ===
Aarne Kauhanen's parents were the merchants Antti Kauhanen and Alma Sundsten. Kauhanen attended seven classes at the Finnish Normal Lyceum in Helsinki, and continued at the Finnish Business School, where he received his diploma in 1928. Kauhanen initially worked as an office clerk in Helsinki until he became an EK clerk in 1933. Kauhanen, known by the code name “Kuha”, was one of ValPo's most anti-Jewish employees.

=== Wartime ===
During the Winter War, he was transferred to supervise foreign volunteers stationed in Ostrobothnia. Shortly after, he became the closest assistant to Arno Anthoni, who was appointed head of Valpo in March 1941. Like Kauhanen, Anthoni was pro-Nazi and antisemitic, as was Toivo Horelli, the interior minister who acted as their supervisor.

After the outbreak of the Continuation War, Kauhanen monitored the foreigners taken into custody and the refugees in the country, also conducting their interrogations. Fluent in German, Kauhanen later acted as a liaison between Valpo and the Kriegsorganisation Finnland of the German military intelligence department, making several trips to German-occupied Estonia and Latvia on Horelli's order. Kauhanen also participated in the recruitment for the Finnish SS Battalion as the office manager of Insinööritoimisto Ratas, a cover organization that recruited volunteers. In the summer of 1942, Kauhanen belonged to a group that hosted Heinrich Himmler during his visit to Finland. In 1944, Kauhanen escorted 11 deportees to Tallinn, when a Czech man reportedly died during a voyage in unclear circumstances.

== After the war ==
Shortly after the Moscow Armistice was concluded in September 1944, Kauhanen fled to Sweden. At the same time, fellow ValPo employees Arno Anthoni, Deputy Manager Ville Pankko, detective Arvid Ojasti and detective Erik Jaarma also fled. In February 1945, Kauhanen announced that he did not intend to return to Finland for fear of the Allied Control Commission, where he was accused of several beatings during interrogations. At the end of 1944, the Polish state had proposed to the Western Allies the addition of Horelli, Anthon and Kauhanen to the list of war criminals, but for some reason, the Soviet-led Monitoring Commission did not forward the request to the Finnish authorities, and thus they were not prosecuted in the war crimes trial.

Kauhanen did not receive asylum from Sweden but continued with a refugee passport issued in Stockholm to Venezuela, where several other Finns had also fled after the war. He is said to have earned his living by trading with Arvid Ojasti. In April 1947, Kauhanen was arrested in Caracas, the capital of Venezuela, after being identified in front of the US Consulate by Edgar Jakapi, an Estonian engineer who was interrogated by Valpo in Helsinki. The Venezuelan authorities interrogated Kauhanen, waiting for more information from Finland as to whether he was considered a war criminal. Jakapi accused Kauhanen of torture, and when information about the arrest arrived to Sweden, Expressen reported several Jewish refugees who said they were willing to testify against him for the beatings and torture during interrogations. However, Kauhanen was not handed over to Finland, but he died in unclear conditions in Venezuela in October 1949.

According to a memoir received by journalist Elina Sana in 1978, an Estonian man named Pikmäk would have shot Kauhanen in Argentina or Uruguay. According to the report, Kauhanen tortured Pikmäk during Valpo's interrogations, and he took revenge. It is also possible that Jakapi shot Kauhanen after identifying him.
