= State Police (Finland) =

Finnish Police Agency (1939–1948)

- Valtiollinen poliisi (Finnish)

Agency overview
- Formed: 1937; 89 years ago
- Preceding agency: Etsivä keskuspoliisi
- Dissolved: 1948; 78 years ago
- Superseding agency: Suojelupoliisi
- Jurisdiction: Finland

The State Police (Finnish: Valtiollinen poliisi, Valpo) was the security agency of Finland from 1937 to 1949. It was replaced by the Finnish Security Intelligence Service.

== History ==
=== Etsivä keskuspoliisi ===
Etsivä keskuspoliisi
Agency overview
- Formed: 1919
- Dissolved: 1937
- Superseding agency: Valtiollinen Poliisi
- Jurisdiction: Republic of Finland

Valtiollinen poliisi has its roots in Osasto III ("Section III") which was formed in summer 1918 by the right wing (so called "whites") of the Finnish Civil War. Its mission was to conduct military intelligence and to monitor the other side of the civil war, the so-called "reds." In the beginning of 1919 the passport section of the general staff which was responsible for internal intelligence was moved under the supervision of the internal ministry and the organizational changes were continued by forming Etsivä keskuspoliisi (EK), which translates directly to "Detecting central police". Etsivä keskuspoliisi was made permanent at the end of 1927, and in December 1937 its name was changed to Valtiollinen poliisi. Later famous politician and president of Finland Urho Kekkonen worked as abitur of jurisprudence and lawyer in EK.

=== Valpo II (Red Valpo) ===
Otto Brusiin was Valpo's director from 26 April 1945 to 10 January 1946 in which time many people were fired from Valpo and replaced with communists and other radical leftists. Many of these people used to be watched by Valpo. This era was commonly called as the "Red Valpo", more officially "Valpo II."

After Brusiin, Valpo had many directors who served only short periods. The true director was considered to be the extra department head Aimo Aaltonen who was also the president of Suomen kommunistinen puolue (SKP) ("The Communist Party of Finland"). He had to resign in 1947 for internal party reasons. His status was later confirmed in Ahlbäck's committee's hearings, and the investigation led to criminal charges against Brusiin and other personnel from Valpo for negligence of official duty.

Valpo was decommissioned in 1948 and replaced with Suojelupoliisi which started its operation at the beginning of 1949 and had a considerably smaller staff.

The archives of Etsivä keskuspoliisi and Valtiollinen poliisi are public up until 1948, and they are kept in the Finnish National archives.
