= Richard Fox =

Richard Fox may refer to:

== Politicians ==
- Richard Fox (died 1435), member of the English parliament for Shropshire
- Richard Maxwell Fox (fl. 1847–1852), member of the UK parliament for Longford
- Richard Kenneth Fox (1925–2017), United States ambassador to Trinidad and Tobago

== Sports ==
- Richard Fox (canoeist) (born 1960), British canoe slalom champion
- Richard Fox (coach) (1899–1960), American college basketball and baseball coach
- Richard Fox (jockey) (1954–2011), Irish-born British jockey and body-double

== Others ==
- Richard Fox (chef) (fl. 2008–2010), British chef, broadcaster and writer
- Richard Alan Fox (born 1943), Australian medical physician
- Richard Kyle Fox (1846–1922), owner of the Police Gazette
  - Richard K. Fox (pilot boat), a 19th-century pilot boat
- Richard Fox (chronicler) (fl. 1448), lay clerk at the abbey of St Albans, where he served as chamberlain to Abbot John Whethamstede
- R. M. Fox (Richard Michael Fox, 1891–1969), Irish journalist and historian
- Richard Edwin Fox (1956–2003), executed by the state of Ohio for kidnap and murder
- Richard J. Fox (1927–2020), American property developer, entrepreneur and philanthropist
- Richard L. Fox, American author and attorney

== See also ==
- Richard Foxe (c. 1448–1528), English churchman and founder of Corpus Christi College, Oxford
- Rick Fox (born 1969), Canadian actor and former basketball player
