= Tijuana bible =

Pornographic comic book

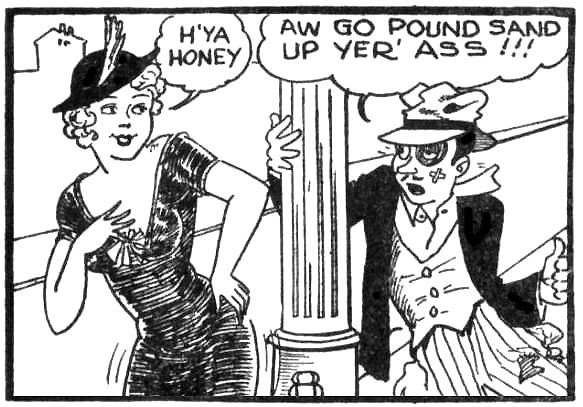
Final page of the Tijuana bible Chris Crusty, drawn by "Mr. Prolific", which borrowed the syndicated comic strip character Chris Crusty created by William Conselman and Charles Plumb for a topper strip which ran above their Ella Cinders

Tijuana bibles (also known as eight-pagers, Tillie-and-Mac books, Jiggs-and-Maggie books, Jo-Jo books, bluesies, blue-bibles, gray-backs, and two-by-fours) were palm-sized erotic comics produced in the United States from the 1920s to the early 1960s. The earliest Tijuana bibles, particularly early "Tillie and Mac" and "Maggie and Jiggs" stories, are dated to 1925. Their popularity peaked during the Great Depression (1929 to 1939).

== Etymology ==
The term "Tijuana bibles" was first noted in Southern California in the late 1940s, and refers to the (incorrect) belief that they were manufactured and smuggled across the Mexico–United States border from Tijuana, Mexico.

== Format ==
The typical format of a Tijuana bible was a wallet-sized 2.5 in × 4 in (64 mm × 102 mm) eight-panel comic printed in black ink on cheap white paper. The artists, writers, and publishers generally remained anonymous, as publication was both illegal and clandestine. Common themes included explicit sexual escapades involving well-known fictional or real-life personalities, used without regard for copyright or libel laws. Tijuana bibles often reflected the ethnic stereotypes prevalent in contemporary culture, though one example, "You Nazi Man", ended with a publisher's plea for tolerance toward Jews in Germany.

== Characters ==
Most Tijuana bibles were pornographic parodies of popular newspaper comic strips of the era, such as Blondie, Barney Google, Moon Mullins, Popeye, Tillie the Toiler, The Katzenjammer Kids, Dick Tracy, Little Orphan Annie, Maggie and Jiggs from the popular newspaper strip Bringing Up Father. These were soon followed by Winnie Winkle, Dumb Dora, Dixie Dugan, Fritzi Ritz, Ella Cinders, and other familiar comic strip characters. Popeye and Blondie were among the most popular characters in the 1930s. “Blackjack” drew a series of ten comics using characters from Snow White, with each of the seven dwarfs starring in his own X-rated title.

The first celebrity bibles were based on real-life newspaper tabloid sex scandals such as the 1926 Peaches Browning case. Ten years later, an entire series of bibles obscenely lampooned Wallis Simpson and the King of England. The most popular celebrity character at that time was Mae West. A series of ten bibles drawn by "Mr. Prolific" was based on famous gangsters, such as Legs Diamond, Al Capone, and Machine Gun Kelly. Another series of ten bibles drawn by Mr. Prolific featured radio stars, including Joe Penner and Kate Smith. The artist working under the alias "Elmer Zilch" drew a series of eight comics about famous boxers such as Jack Dempsey. Others featured caricatures of movie and sports stars like Mae West, W. C. Fields, Clark Gable, Joan Crawford, the Marx Brothers, Cary Grant, Jean Harlow, Babe Ruth, Lou Gehrig, and Joe Louis, often with only slightly altered names.

In addition to comic strip characters and celebrities, many bibles featured nameless stock characters such as taxi drivers, firemen, traveling salesmen, farmer's daughters, icemen, and maids. Mr. Prolific's "Fuller Brush Man" (in which a door-to-door salesman named Ted starred in a series of ten episodic eight-page adventures) was one of the few original recurring characters created expressly for the bibles.

== Artists ==
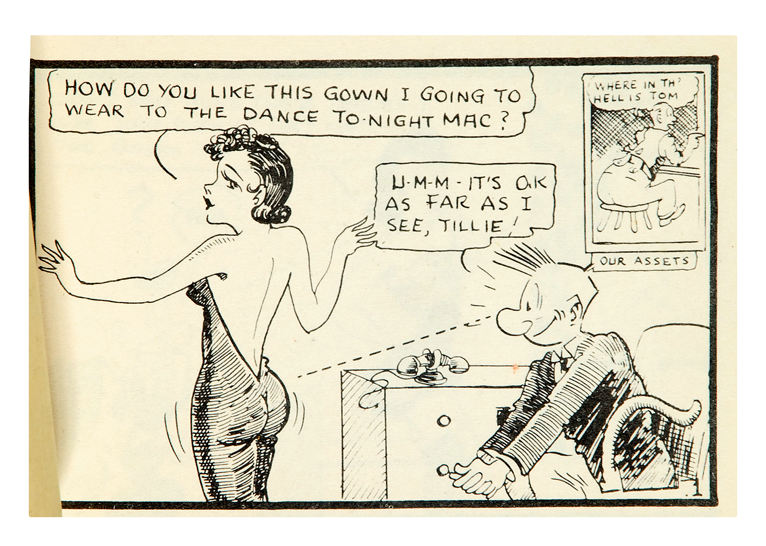
Panel from a Tillie and Mac Tijuana bible strip drawn by "Elmer Zilch"

Little is known about the anonymous artists who produced the Tijuana bibles. Wesley Morse (who later went on to draw Bazooka Joe) drew many of those appearing shortly before World War II, most notably about a dozen titles inspired by the 1939 New York World's Fair. Freelance cartoonist Doc Rankin is alleged to be the creator of hundreds of Tijuana bibles in the 1930s, although this remains unproven. Gershon Legman, who was involved in the erotic book trade in New York City in the 1930s, claimed that Rankin was paid $35 weekly to produce two eight-pagers. Rankin then delivered the work to Louis Shomer. During World War II, with the production of new Tijuana bible titles shut down, Shomer employed Wesley Morse to produce hundreds of unsigned and uncredited cartoons, illustrations, cover art and advertisements for his line of joke books, Larch Publications.

In addition to his identification of Rankin, Legman also claimed to know that one of the major Tijuana bible artists was a woman. A declassified FBI memorandum from the early 1940s confirms that they knew one of the main artists to be a woman, but the artist's name has been redacted from the document. It is likely that the artist referred to was Blackjack, who has never been positively identified but may possibly have been Legman's acquaintance, Clara Tice. Blackjack drew upon movie star fan magazines, both for story ideas and for visual reference, for titles like William Powell and Myrna Loy in "Nuts to Will Hays!", and followed the storylines of the daily newspaper comics closely and satirized them: the plot and characters of Annie and Rose in "Doughnut Girls Fill Up the Holes!" fits right in to the 1938 story arc in which Little Orphan Annie and her grownup friend Rose Chance tried to beat the Great Depression by starting a doughnut-making business. Blackjack's two baseball-themed bibles, featuring New York Yankees Joe DiMaggio, Lou Gehrig and Lefty Gomez, show a good awareness of the latest tabloid gossip about the Yankees' love lives as of spring training 1937, although the pairing of Lou Gehrig with Mae West seems to be purely a figment of Blackjack's imagination.

Collectors have assigned names to several anonymous artists with recognizable styles: "Mr. Prolific" was the creator of the "Adventures of a Fuller Brush Man" series, and the master of a sure-handed, elegant steel-pen inking style. "Mr. Dyslexic" was a seemingly clumsy, semi-literate artist who produced numerous titles in the postwar period, some with political content (e.g., Senator Robert A. Taft breaking a strike by sleeping with union members' wives). "Blackjack" was an artist active around 1938 whose work frequently depicted imaginary pairings of famous Hollywood movie stars, the artwork featuring large solid black areas and sometimes resembling linoleum block prints. The name "Elmer Zilch" appears on a number of bibles that appeared circa 1934. Zilch was an early and witty creator of the mid-1930s, rivaling Mr. Prolific in talent, popularity, and productivity.

Commentators have claimed to discern the styles of many artists who produced bibles during their heyday, with the most productive artists (Mr. Prolific and Elmer Zilch) each drawing from 150 to 200 titles, followed by the output of Wesley Morse, Blackjack, and Mr. Dyslexic, who each produced about half that many. These five artists may have drawn half of all the Tijuana bibles ever produced. There were also two anonymous artists in the 1950s who each drew about 60 to 80 works, sold for a dime each to a clientele which allegedly consisted largely of high school boys. These late-period bible series included such titles as "Bellhop Kicks Dog" and a number of "Archie"-themed comics.

A few observers believe that Mr. Prolific and Elmer Zilch may even have been the same artist working in two styles to vary his output and extend his shelf life. The byline "Elmer Zilch" appears on a number of Tijuana bibles which evidently came on the market in 1934 and 1935, and the same artist's unmistakable "big-foot" cartoony style can be seen in many more. The name "Elmer Zilch" referred to a fictional character who was the mascot of the humor magazine Ballyhoo.

The total number of distinct stories produced has been estimated by Art Spiegelman to be between 700 and 1,000.

== Production ==
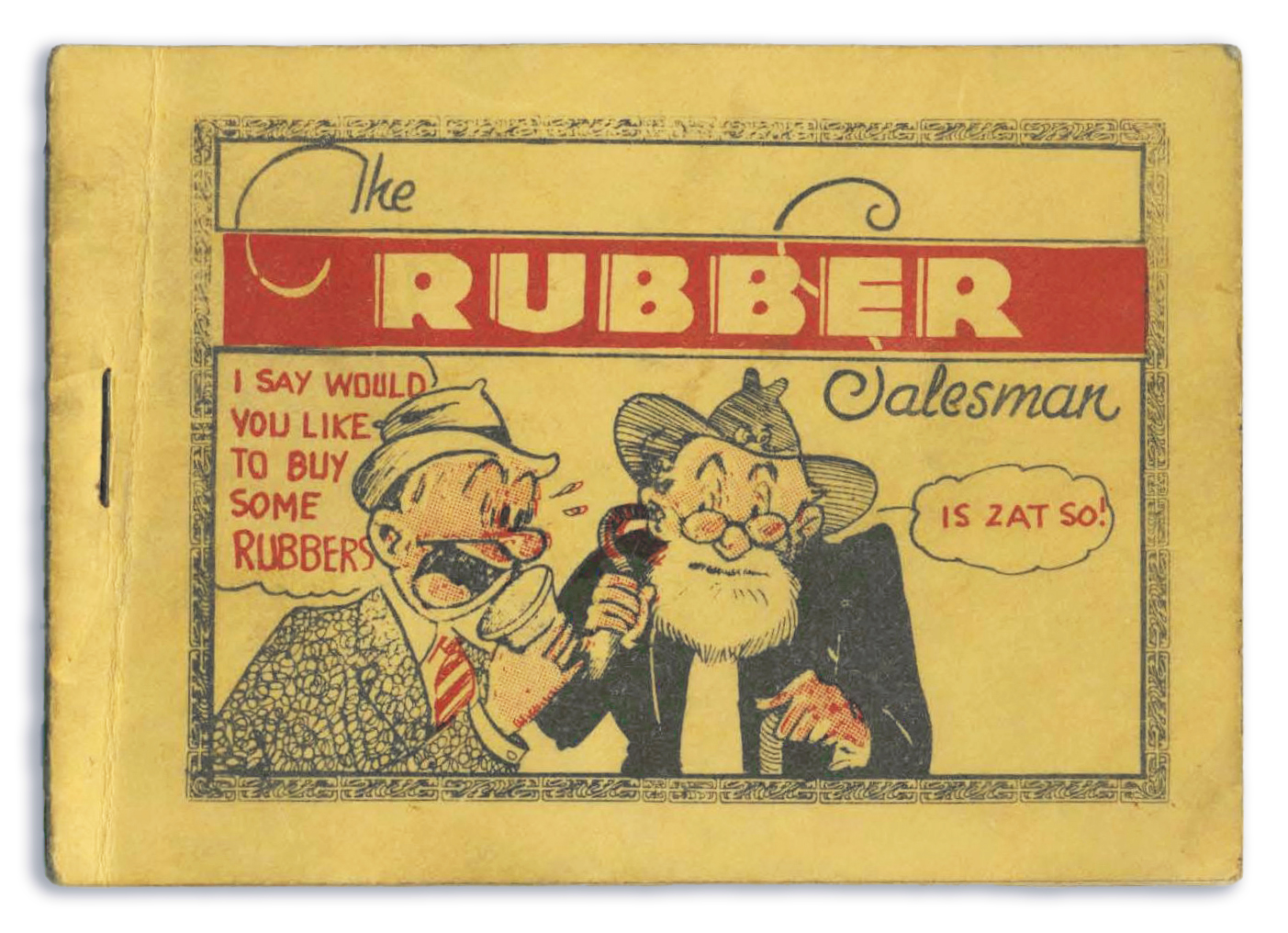
The Rubber Salesman (c. 1935), drawn in the hand of "Elmer Zilch", showing the "Ornate Border" design

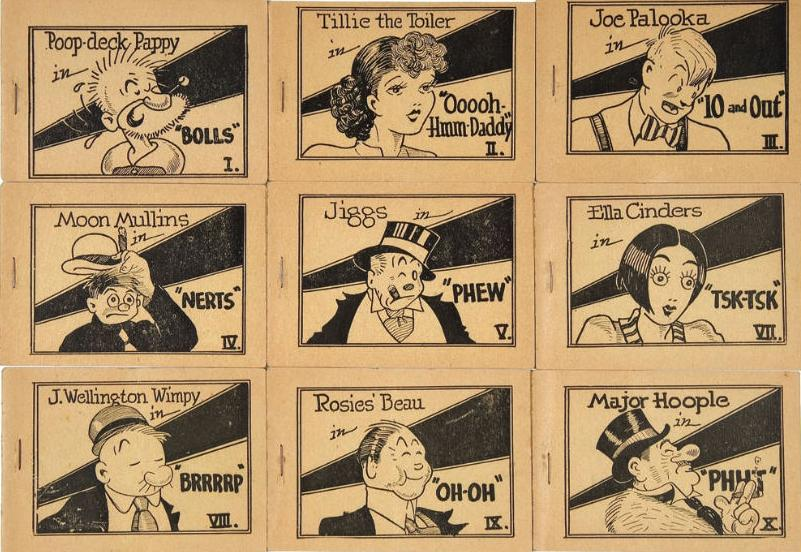
A set of Tijuana bibles drawn by "Mr. Prolific". This set was released in 1936 and usually sold for a quarter each. Nine of the ten comics in the set are shown.

One of a set of ten Tijuana bibles issued in 1936 obscenely lampooning Wallis Simpson

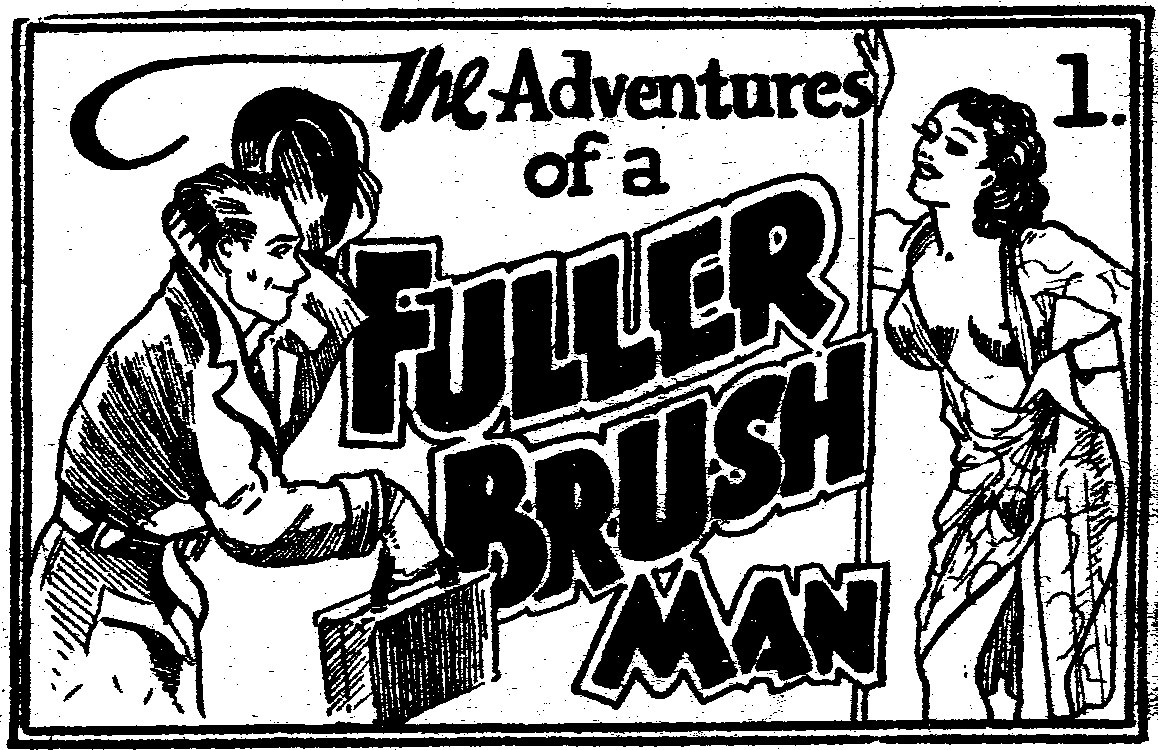
The first eight-page installment of The Adventures of a Fuller Brush Man, published c. 1936

The ten-book series format was dictated by the limitations of the printing equipment used to print the bibles, which made it convenient to print a set of ten titles at a time, side by side on a large sheet which was then cut into strips, collated, folded, and stapled. Typically, a new set of ten would be issued every couple of months, all drawn by the same artist, featuring ten cartoon characters or celebrities. For several months in 1935, Elmer Zilch and his publishers experimented with a ten-page format, issued with two-tone covers in four sets of eight, plus one set of ten (the "Salesmen" series) in the eight-page format. Each panel in this series was surrounded by an intricate engraved arabesque border, possibly intended as an anti-counterfeiting device as it was hard to reproduce, and the series became known to collectors as the "Ornate Borders" series. Only 42 bibles are known by collectors to have been issued in this style, and most of them were soon being reprinted in truncated eight-page versions. Often the added two pages were simply filler gag panels drawn by Zilch.

In addition to the eight-pagers, there were also the more expensive "16-pagers", printed in a larger page size with more pages, and usually more carefully drawn and better printed. These were high-priced and less common than the eight-pagers but showcased the artists' best work.

In the 1930s, many early bibles bore phony imprints of non-existent companies such as "London Press", "La France Publishing", and "Tobasco Publishing Co." in London, Paris, and Havana. The popular line using the "Tobasco" imprint was around the underground market for a couple of years and also printed a number of pamphlet-sized erotic fiction readers, in addition to about 60 Tijuana bible titles, most of them original.

Millions of Tijuana bibles were printed and sold in the 1930s, the heyday of the bibles. But the number of new Tijuana bible titles being produced took a nosedive at the beginning of World War II, and the industry never recovered. Factors in the decline of the Tijuana bibles at this time may have included police raids and the retirement of Doc Rankin, who was called up by the military at the beginning of the war, along with wartime shortages of paper and printing supplies. Printing plates of older bibles were worn down through continued reprintings until they were nearly blank, and original plates lost in police raids had to be replaced with new plates crudely recut by hamfisted, untrained amateur engravers. The quality of Tijuana bibles available on the market suffered, and prices dropped as sales plummeted.

Comics artist and historian Art Spiegelman notes that records do not seem to exist of prosecutions against publishers and artists for making Tijuana bibles; the cartoonist added, however, that authorities occasionally seized shipments and people selling Tijuana bibles. According to Spiegelman, it is not clear whether mom and pop outfits or organized crime created the small salacious booklets. Old newspaper crime stories seem to indicate that most bibles were the product of a fairly small group of independent small businessmen with their own printing presses, invariably springing up again in a new location after a police raid shut them down. These businessmen manufactured a variety of pornographic products, including pornographic playing cards, gag greeting cards, and film reels, and created their own underground distribution routes around the United States.

When the business was revived after the war, the quality of new bibles was dismal: they were poorly drawn, badly printed, and the stories were amateurish and puerile compared to the work of a decade before. Mr. Dyslexic, the leading artist of the postwar era, was possessed of an almost staggering lack of drawing talent matched only by his bad taste and ignorance of the English language. His best-known work "Traveling Preacher" is a lengthy, labored-over retelling of a novel by Erskine Caldwell (Journeyman), whom Mr. Dyslexic then proceeded to acknowledge by making Caldwell himself the star of another scabrous Tijuana bible ("Erskine Caldwell in Grandpa's Revenge").

A few attempts at serialization were also made, most notably in the "Fuller Brush Man" stories. During the Senate racket investigations of the 1950s, a New York businessman named Abe Rubin was asked if there was any truth to the rumor picked up by a Chicago police lieutenant that he had once been the original printer and distributor of the series. The Fuller Brush Man stories made a very weak stab at continuity (e.g., "The following week I was sent to Tallahassee"), but each eight-panel story was self-contained. The only real serial stories told in the eight-pager format were three tales by Blackjack, featuring original characters named Fifi, Maizie, and Tessie, in "To be continued" narratives which stretched through three or four installments before concluding.

== Distribution ==
People would order these cartoon books from advertisements that appeared in the back pages of the National Police Gazette starting in the late 1920s. At that time, Tijuana bibles were shipped around the United States through commercial express offices such as the Railway Express Agency. It was a serious criminal offense to send them via the United States Postal Service (USPS), and one mail order dealer was sentenced to 5 years in Leavenworth in 1932 for simply soliciting orders from his customers through the USPS. When the USPS was used, complex schemes were used to foil postal inspectors, involving mail-forwarding, one-time use postal boxes, and non-existent addresses.

Due to the high success rate of the postal authorities in defeating these schemes, the documents were more commonly sold locally rather than through the USPS. Tijuana bibles were sold under the counter for 25 cents in places where men congregated: barrooms, bowling alleys, garages, tobacco shops, barber shops, and burlesque houses.

Easy access to commercial shipping was suddenly cut off in the mid-1930s, so manufacturers began delivering the products to depots around the country. The small size of the bibles made them easy to transport—50,000 bibles could fit in the trunk of a car. Clandestine distribution centers were located in basements, lofts, and back alley garages in a chain of large cities on an east–west axis from New York City to Kansas City, loosely following the route of the old National Road and generally avoiding the South and New England which were regarded as dangerous places to be arrested for pornography. Boston's Scollay Square, however, was a place where Tijuana bibles could readily be purchased at novelty shops. A distributor's territory might be a large city, several counties, or an entire state, with the territorial boundaries being assigned by the national distributors, who regulated things by limiting the amount of goods delivered to each local distributor to the quantity that could readily be sold inside their assigned territory.

== Police seizures ==
A newspaper headline from the Poughkeepsie Eagle News, February 12, 1930

The earliest known seizure of Tijuana bibles occurred in Terre Haute, Indiana, in 1926, when a cache of bibles was discovered in a student's school locker at Wiley High School. Police traced the source back to Charles Jewett (managing editor of the Terre Haute Star) and his son. A federal charge was also placed against them because some of the bibles had been shipped across state lines to Rochester, Minnesota. Charles Jewett was sentenced to six months in a state workhouse, after which he and his son left Terre Haute.

Another arrest occurred in midtown Manhattan in 1930.

In 1930, a woman in Dover Plains, New York, notified the local police after discovering two Tijuana bibles in the back pocket of her 17-year-old nephew's jeans. One of these documents was identified as "The Old Man Steps Out", a Maggie and Jiggs title. The police were told that the documents had been procured from a man from Poughkeepsie. Though this man was never identified, he might have been Abe Rubin, a Tijuana bible distributor who was arrested in the nearby village of Wingdale in 1932.

Men selling pornographic booklets on the midway at the 1939 New York World's Fair were followed to a warehouse near the Brooklyn Navy Yard, where David Brotman and Ben Reisberg were arrested and a cache of 350,000 printed items and photos and 50,000 condoms was seized, along with printing plates.

The scale on which Tijuana bibles were produced can be gauged from the large hauls announced in police seizures. Eight million bibles were reported seized in a 1942 raid by FBI agent Percy E. Foxworth and his men on a Manhattan warehouse and a printing plant in the loft over a garage in the South Bronx. Jacob and David Brotman were arrested in that raid, along with several associates. The majority of the Tijuana bibles circulating in the United States were being printed in this loft at that time. According to the FBI, four tons of material were ready to ship across the country, and seven tons had already gone out and were being rounded up at various regional distribution centers. Jacob Brotman was identified as one of the main players in the Tijuana bible trade in Jay Gertzman's Bookleggers and Smuthounds, and he had previously been arrested in a 1936 raid on a Lower East Side loft which produced a large haul of bibles, erotic fiction, pornographic playing cards, nude photos, cutting and binding equipment, and a printing press.

As a result of the 1942 raids the FBI came into possession of thousands of engraved printing plates used to print the original bibles. A large file consisting of over 5,000 specimen bibles was maintained at FBI headquarters, for the purpose of tracing printers and distributors. The FBI monitored the Tijuana bible trade but rarely made arrests.

During this period, as many as 50,000 copies of a single title were printed and distributed around the country through an underground network of local and regional distributors, many of them former bootleggers. A local distributor such as Andrew Hepler in northern Virginia or Frank Lang in Pittsburgh would typically buy them in bulk batches of 20,000 or more, break the shipment into packets of 100 or so bibles, and drive around the distribution territory dropping them off at pool halls, gas stations, barber shops, and taverns. If the distributor did not cross a state line while making his rounds, it was very difficult to charge him (or her, in a few cases) with a federal offense, although in the Hepler case authorities were able to sentence him to five years in the Atlanta Penitentiary—not for distributing pornography, but on the charge that he had cheated his business partner on the proceeds.

In New York City, periodic police raids were conducted for decades, usually at the instigation of John S. Sumner and the New York Society for the Suppression of Vice, which closely watched the trade in pornography in the city during the years of its existence. In Boston, this function was carried out by the Watch and Ward Society, which coordinated their efforts with Sumner's organization. The Illinois Vigilance Association was a similar group in Chicago. In Philadelphia, Mary Hubbert Ellis, a Primitive Methodist minister, assembled a group that conducted a series of raids on the local pornography industry for two years. This group disbanded in 1934, after Ellis was arrested for accepting a $100 donation from one of the dealers in exchange for not raiding his premises. Mr. Prolific mocked these foes in one of his works, in the form of a guardian of public morals named "Smuthound" who apprehends Betty Boop while she is engaged in having sex with a lifeguard on the beach (Betty Boop in "Improvising").

== Cultural references ==
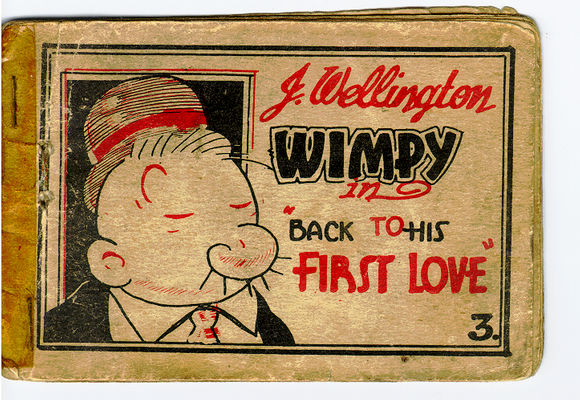
The cover of a typical Tijuana bible. This one features Wimpy, and is drawn in the style of the anonymous "Mr. Prolific".

Tijuana bibles were among the first underground comix. They featured original material at a time when legitimate American comic books were still reprinting newspaper strips. After World War II, the quality and the popularity of the Tijuana bible declined.

Early in the graphic novel Watchmen, the current Silk Spectre (Laurie Juspeczyk) visits her mother (past Silk Spectre Sally Jupiter) and briefly reads a Tijuana bible featuring her. Sally finds it flattering and keeps it as a reminder of her past sex appeal, but Laurie finds the comic obscene. The same Tijuana bible is later given away as a gift, owing to its present nature as a collector's novelty item.

Will Eisner features Tijuana bibles in the first pages of his book The Dreamer, though nothing explicit is shown. His protagonist Billy is a young artist out looking for work who is offered a job illustrating them by a printer and a mobster. He is shocked and incensed and asks if they are legal. The vignette serves to focus conflict between the character's dream and reality, but also between legitimate and illicit comic production. Dejected, Billy says that he will think it over. The theme is reminiscent of a real-life episode described by Eisner about being asked by a shady Brooklyn businessman to draw for the publications at a rate of $3 a page, which was good money at the time.

Joe Shuster drew Tijuana bible–like illustrations for an underground bondage-themed erotic series called Nights of Horror in the early 1950s. His male characters are strongly reminiscent of Superman, and some of his female characters resemble Lois Lane. Thousands of copies of Nights of Horror were seized in a police raid on a Times Square book store, but Shuster's name did not come to light in the ensuing prosecution.

Hugh Hefner experimentally used several Tijuana bibles as samples for a projected series which was never published, when he was a struggling cartoonist in Chicago in the early 1950s, around the same time that he issued his self-published cartoon book That Toddlin' Town.

The title character in the 1959 semi-autobiographical Canadian novel The Apprenticeship of Duddy Kravitz by Mordecai Richler sells Tijuana bibles to his high school classmates, some featuring Dick Tracy, after buying them in bulk from a newsstand vendor who assigns him a small part of the city as his sales territory. He hears that the news vendor has been arrested, then panics and destroys all the bibles.

The English garage punk band The Flaming Stars released the album Tijuana Bible in 2000.

A 1954 episode of Dragnet ("The Big Producer") had Sgt. Joe Friday breaking up a high school smut ring which includes a teenage boy (played by Martin Milner) selling eight-pagers out of his school locker. They are called "joke books" by the seller.

During Year Six (2007) of the webcomic Something Positive, lead character Davan MacIntire discovers that the man whom he is named after, a cousin of his grandfather, had worked as a writer/artist of Tijuana bibles in the late 1930s. Randy Milholland, the creator of Something Positive, then created a spin-off series called Something Positive 1937 to tell the story of the first Davan.

In the graphic 2007 novel The League of Extraordinary Gentlemen: Black Dossier by Alan Moore and Kevin O'Neill, the titular Dossier contains a mock Tijuana bible (actually printed in cheap newsprint and included with the book) which, in the context of the story, was published by Pornsec, a department of the government of Big Brother (from George Orwell's novel Nineteen Eighty-Four).

In 2008, comic artists Ethan Persoff and Scott Marshall created an eight-page mock Tijuana bible lampooning President George W. Bush and Presidential hopeful John McCain entitled Obliging Lady. The comic was distributed at the 2008 Democratic National Convention.

In a 2018 issue of Howard Chaykin's satire of the comics industry, Hey Kids! Comics!, two freelance comic book artists are shown furtively delivering artwork for upcoming Tijuana bibles to the (fictional) offices of the Tobasco Publishing Co.

== See also ==
- Chick tract
- Robert Crumb
- Elsagate
- Fan fiction
- Dōjinshi
- Hentai
- Rule 34 (Internet meme)
