= Belle Gordon =

American vaudeville performer

- Gordon pictured in the August 1905 issue of Everybody's Magazine
- Born: c. 1880
- Occupations: Vaudeville artist; boxer; writer
- Years active: 1894–1915
- Notable work: Physical Culture for Women
- Spouse: Billy Curtis

Belle Gordon (born c. 1880) was an American vaudeville performer, boxer, and writer on physical culture. She was known for her bag-punching act and the great skill with which she speed-boxed. She competed in speed boxing and won against male professional boxers on multiple occasions, and she won a competition to hold the title of "Champion Female Bag Puncher of the World". She wrote a book titled Physical Culture for Women, the first fitness book written by a female celebrity athlete, as part of the series of exercise books published by Richard Kyle Fox.

== Early life ==
Many details surrounding Gordon's life outside of her career are unknown. An 1898 interview in The Cincinnati Post called her "a Cincinnati girl" while a 1903 interview in the San Francisco Chronicle said that she was instead "a little backwoods girl from down in old Kentucky".

She told interviewers that she was inspired to begin boxing after watching Bob Fitzsimmons box in Kentucky when she was 14 years old. She may have been referencing a match held in Louisville on December 16, 1894, in which Fitzsimmons fought for three rounds with boxer Tom McCarthy before giving an exhibition on bag-punching. She stated that, on the day after witnessing Fitzsimmons box, she went to the father of a childhood friend who had experience in training boxers. They set up a crudely made punching bag and began training. She weighed about 90 pounds (41 kg) when she began her training.

== Career ==
Gordon began traveling and giving exhibitions around 1894. In January 1895, she fought a three-round exhibition match against former professional boxer Billy Curtis in his home city of Indianapolis, Indiana. They fought again in August that year at the Buckingham Theater in Louisville, Kentucky. As a vaudeville act, their fights were choreographed and considered a "comedy" act. Gordon was the winner of the choreographed fights. She began training with John Donaldson, a New York gym owner and boxer, who taught her how to punch a speed bag. After working with Donaldson, Gordon and Curtis decided to add a solo bag-punching act for Gordon after their fights. By 1896, Gordon and Curtis traveled and appeared in vaudeville venues across the northeastern United States. As Gordon's skills at her bag-punching act improved, she quickly became far more popular than Curtis and received much more press coverage. She appeared in the National Police Gazette in 1896 at 16 years old. The Gazette article stated that she never missed the punching bag, and that she was more talented than James J. Corbett and Bob Fitzsimmons, and "just about as clever" as Tommy Ryan. In the article, she stated that she was frustrated with imitators that tried to copy her act, such as Jack Burke.

Belle Gordon with her boxing partner Billy Curtis in 1896

In 1896, Gordon met with Sam Austin, the editor of the National Police Gazette, and used the magazine to circulate an open challenge for any woman to try to out-point her in bag-punching with a bounty of $250 ($9,675 in 2025). Austin used the magazine's own money to raise the bounty multiple times in the coming months, including up to as much as $1,000 ($38,700 in 2025) but nobody accepted the challenge. On July 23, 1897, the National Police Gazette hosted a competition at the Broadway Athletic Club in New York City to determine who would hold the rightful title of "Champion Female Bag Puncher of the World". Austin served as referee, and Gordon defeated seven other women and claimed the title. For her victory, she was awarded a gold medal that was designed and donated by Richard Kyle Fox, the owner of the Gazette. She wore the medal at every performance for years afterwards. After the competition she was regularly featured in the Gazette and Austin helped promote her and keep her in public spotlight. Owing to her newfound fame, she competed with several professional boxers in the coming years. She defeated Joe Gans in a bag-punching contest in 1896 and defeated Jack Ward in 1898. She also won a fight against two men at once, with The Commercial Tribune reporting that she made "short work" of them. In 1902 she challenged world heavyweight champion Jim Jeffries to an exhibition bag-punching contest and won. In 1913, Richard Kyle Fox presented Gordon with a championship belt similar to the belts that he presented to male boxers, and she defended her title on many occasions.

In the Summer of 1897, Gordon and Curtis performed in London and were so well-received that they were invited to return the next year. Sam Austin connected Gordon and Curtis with Steve Brodie, a performer who gained fame from jumping off of the Brooklyn Bridge. They joined Brodie's burlesque group and toured with him in the Winter of 1897–98. Over the next few years, they toured and performed at vaudeville shows in Washington, DC; Providence, Rhode Island; New York City; Indianapolis, Indiana; and Chicago, Illinois, as well as smaller towns between the cities. From 1899–1900 they toured across Europe, performing in Berlin, Hamburg, Hanover, Vienna, and Paris. They performed in Paris during the 1900 Exposition Universelle and the 1900 Summer Olympics. A boxing match between Gordon and Curtis was filmed by Thomas Edison. The film, titled Comedy Set-To, was captured on 50 feet of film and was 40 seconds long. No copies of the film still exist, making it a lost film. Thomas Edison also published a female boxing film titled The Gordon Sisters Boxing, although those Gordon sisters were unrelated to Belle Gordon. By 1899, Gordon and Curtis were reported to have married, although the marriage did not last. The length of the marriage and their reasons for separation are not known. In 1900, after returning to the United States from Europe, she no longer performed with Curtis.

The cover of Physical Culture for Women by Belle Gordon

By 1900, a popular song titled "That's My Girl" was written about her, and her photograph was featured on the cover of the sheet music. In 1903 she had a product endorsement deal and appeared alongside Gus Ruhlin in advertisements for a tonic called "Blood Wine". After her split with Curtis, Gordon began to dress in more feminine clothing and began doing more elaborate speed punching routines. She began using two, then three, then five, then nine bags in her routine, sometimes hitting them all to the beat of music while blindfolded. In 1902, she was interviewed by The Times in Philadelphia and endorsed bag-punching as an exercise for women to improve their physique. In 1903, she began incorporating lectures on physical culture into her act, educating audiences on exercise and fitness. That year she authored a three-part series of articles for the San Francisco Chronicle with advice for training with a punching bag. The articles were titled "Bag Punching for Health and Beauty", "Bag Punching in a Ball Gown for Health", and "Bag Punching Fashion's Newest Fad". She published an additional article in 1905 titled "Limbering Up for the Bathing Suit" with advice about losing weight to appear physically fit in swimwear. In 1904, she wrote an exercise book titled Physical Culture for Women, published by Richard Kyle Fox as part of the Fox Athletic Series. She posed for 36 photos in the book to illustrate exercises. This was the first fitness book written by a female celebrity athlete. She also was the cover model of the National Police Gazette multiple times. For around ten years after the publication of her book, she continued performing vaudeville, but focused more on smaller towns, especially in the Western United States. She joined up with violinist Al Barber in 1909, and they toured together until 1913. She also performed on her own in Vancouver, Canada, in 1908 and 1913. Their routine consisted of Gordon performing her ten-minute bag-punching act as Barber set the pace with his violin, increasing speed throughout the performance. Gordon's final known performance was in South Bend, Indiana, on November 19, 1915.

Belle Gordon was the most famous bag-puncher in vaudeville. Owing to Gordon's defiance of gender norms while also embracing femininity through sport, scholar Jan Todd described her as representative of the "New Woman" of the late 19th and early 20th century. Similarly, historian Irene Gammel stated that she represented a "transitioning from old to new era, a transition in which the woman is the agent".
