= Wesley Morse =

American cartoonist

- Born: June 17, 1897 Chicago, Ill.
- Died: June 20, 1963 (aged 66)
- Area: Cartoonist
- Notable works: Bazooka Joe; Tijuana bibles

Wesley Morse was an American comic artist and advertising illustrator.

== History ==
Born Wesley Cherry Morse in Chicago in 1897, the son of Charles and Fanny Cherry (1870–1946), Wesley Morse eventually settled in New York City. In 1918, Morse joined the Army, spending a year in France in a field artillery battery.

Following his experience overseas Morse returned to New York, where, starting in 1921, he became a regular contributor of sketches to magazines like Film Fun, Snappy Stories, Judge, and Shadowland. Chorus girls and flappers were frequent subjects of his. For a couple of years in the early 1920s he worked alongside Alberto Vargas as one of the artists for the Ziegfeld Follies, while living in the fashionable Hotel des Artistes near Central Park. He also contributed art to magazine advertisements in Collier's, The New Yorker, and Life.

Morse was one of only two known authors of underground "Tijuana Bible" comics in the 1930s (Doc Rankin is believed to be another), and memorably created a series of them that used the 1939 World's Fair as their setting and were, according to legend, clandestinely sold at the fair itself. Morse drew 60 of the little booklets, as well as four of the larger, more expensive 16-page books from the same publishers.

Morse collaborated with H. C. Witwer on the comic strip Switchboard Sally in 1925, and drew Victor E. Pazmiño's newspaper strip Frolicky Fables in 1926. He drew the strips Kitty of the Chorus in the New York Daily Mirror in 1925, May and June for the New York Graphic in 1927, and Beau Gus with Bud Wiley (rejected 1933 trial strips for a "Tillie and Mac" style newspaper comic) which appeared in the early comic book Circus: The Comic Riot in 1938. For a few months in 1925 he was probably the anonymous ghost who drew Polly and Her Pals for Cliff Sterrett while he was on sabbatical. During World War II he drew hundreds of unsigned gag cartoons for newsstand joke books issued by Louis Shomer's Larch Publications; he also worked for the Blackstone Company, an advertising agency where his friend Monte Proser, the owner of the Copacabana, had been an account executive. One of his World's Fair themed Tijuana bibles even shows the night club Proser was operating at the Fair, The Zombie, and its namesake signature drink.

Before marrying Lucy Olsen (1910–1951) in 1944, Morse dated extensively, including relationships with Ruby Keeler, Avonne Taylor, and Barbara Stanwyck. He had a son, Talley Morse, who was the inspiration for many of the Bazooka Joe strips.

== Bibliography ==
- Bazooka Joe and His Gang: 60th Anniversary Collection. Abrams Books. (2013). ISBN 978-1-41970-632-5.
- The Life and Art of Wesley Morse, by Nancy Morse and Kirk Taylor. (2015). ISBN 978-1-51164-600-0.
- Tijuana Bibles: Art and Wit in America's Forbidden Funnies, 1930s–1950s. Simon & Schuster. (1997). ISBN 978-0-68483-461-0.
