= Who Killed Hitler? =

1947 book

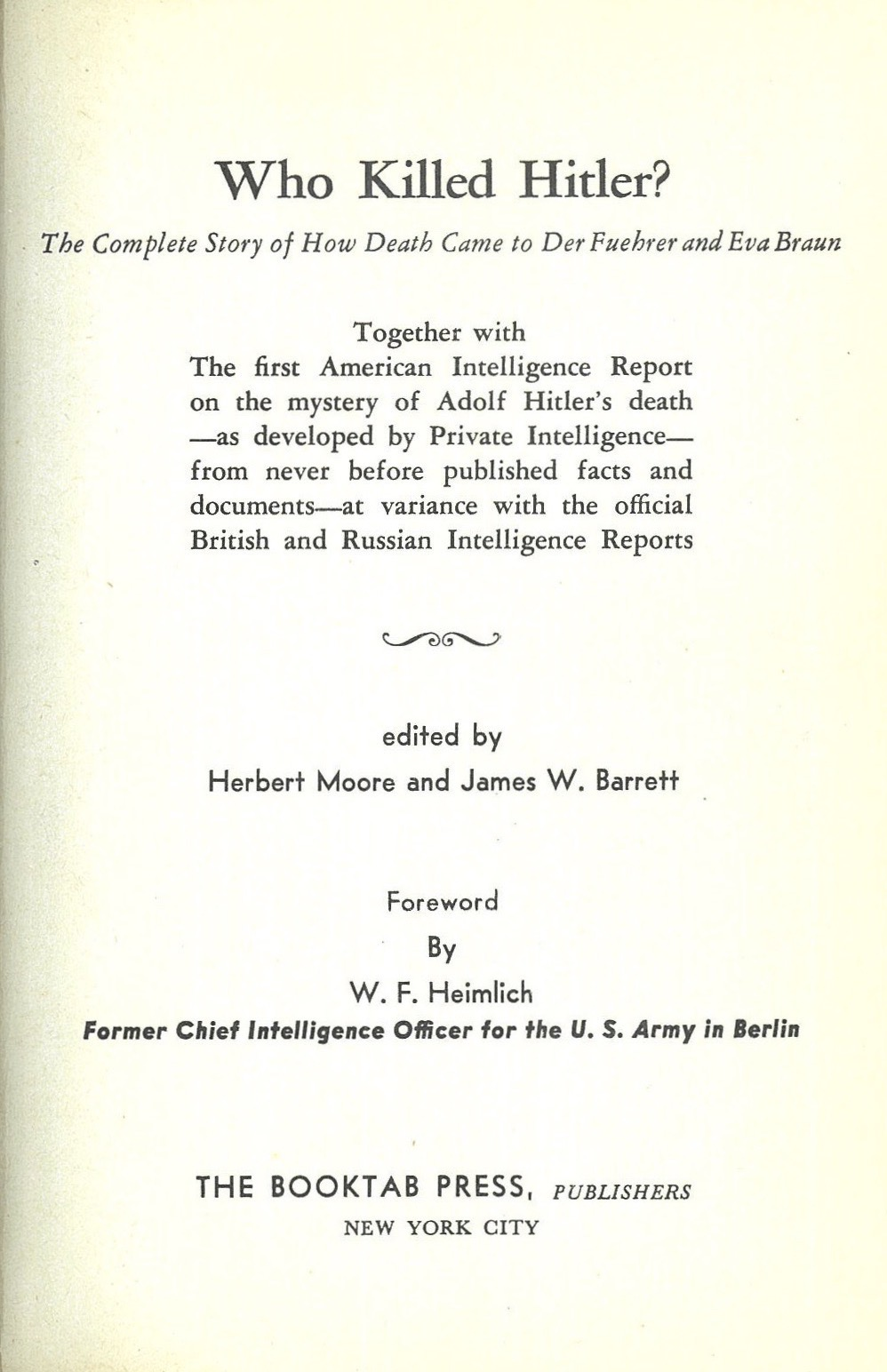
The book's title page

Who Killed Hitler? is a 1947 American book edited by Herbert Moore and James W. Barrett, with an introduction by U.S. intelligence officer William F. Heimlich. The book contends that rather than commit suicide or escape Germany (as held by Western and Soviet sources, respectively), Nazi leader Adolf Hitler was assassinated in an attempted coup d'état by Schutzstaffel (SS) leader Heinrich Himmler.

Although the book dismisses fringe claims that Hitler faked his death, it was itself criticized for bolstering them—in part regarding an alleged Hitler double.

== Introduction ==
In the introduction to the book, U.S. intelligence officer William F. Heimlich claims that the crater in the Reich Chancellery garden Adolf Hitler and Eva Braun were reputedly buried in had not been excavated prior to his team's one-day investigation in December 1945. He asserts that both Reichssicherheitsdienst (RSD) guard Hermann Karnau and RSD guard Erich Mansfeld (who made contradictory statements about the cremations) were unreliable, lacking knowledge of the bunker layout including which direction the Führerbunker entrance faced. (Heimlich's team referred to a "rather sketchy map" drawn by Karnau, which omits any detailed layout of the Chancellery grounds outside the bunker.)

Heimlich would expound on his claims in the early 1950s via the National Police Gazette, an American tabloid-style magazine. He claimed that according to U.S. tests, the blood found on Hitler's sofa did not match his blood type, contrary to Soviet claims. Heimlich also alleged that during their day of access to the bunker grounds, the Americans sifted the garden dirt and found no trace of burnt bodies.

== Assassination theory ==
The book dramatizes Hitler's retreat to the Führerbunker and the events leading to his suicide, apparently drawing from the transcripts of his stenographers. He refused pleas from his staff to attempt escape, saying he must die in Berlin in obedience to his own orders. He instructed his inner circle to organize their own suicides and arrange for the destruction of their bodies (as he intended to do by burning). His pilot Hanna Reitsch and Generalfeldmarschall Robert Ritter von Greim planned to detonate a grenade after taking cyanide. After learning of Reichsführer-SS Heinrich Himmler's negotiation with the western Allies, Hitler ordered Reitsch and von Greim to go call for help from General Walther Wenck, despite his army having essentially already lost the Battle of Berlin.

The authors suggest that Himmler attempted to assassinate Hitler so he could replace him and prevent Nazi Germany's total destruction by surrendering to the Allies. He ostensibly arranged for Hitler's murder by poison injection (delivered by Hitler's physician Ludwig Stumpfegger), with SS-Sturmbannführer Otto Günsche delivering a coup de grâce-style gunshot to the corpse hours later, at the recorded time of the suicides (Günsche also shooting the hesitant Braun). The book asserts that during the initial Soviet investigation, all relevant evidence was "gathered, sifted, identified and sent off to Moscow". The book cites a Soviet report of Hitler's death by poison as depending on the assertion that Günsche "buried the body [of Hitler] in a secret vault below the floor of the underground bunker".

The book discusses an alleged Hitler double that was purportedly seen in the kitchen of the bunker complex and housed in a secret room, supposedly employed by Himmler as a political decoy to protect Hitler before complicating his plan to orchestrate the dictator's death. Though the book's claim of Hitler using doubles is likely false, the Soviets produced a body resembling Hitler on the Chancellery grounds, initially confusing it for the body of Hitler himself, then implying it to be Hitler's body as part of their disinformation campaign that Hitler escaped. The book asserts that Soviet leader Joseph Stalin "[kept] the ghost of Hitler alive" to galvanize his "totalitarian" communist forces in an example of the 'big lie' technique often used by the Nazis.

== Supporting documentation ==
The book novelly includes a report from American private intelligence, citing Heimlich's investigation in presenting its own conclusion that Hitler was assassinated. Also included are the official British intelligence report by Hugh Trevor-Roper, an outline of official Soviet intelligence reports, and contradictory statements by RSD guard Hermann Karnau and Hitler's chauffeur Erich Kempka.

== Legacy ==
Soviet journalist Lev Bezymenski cited the book in the 1982 edition of his propaganda book The Death of Adolf Hitler, claiming to have only recently learned of it, despite saying in the 1968 edition of his book that the Soviets thought Günsche delivered a coup de grâce-style shot. Bezymenski claims that the 1947 book argues for the necessary time window on the basis of the unreliability of eyewitness statements about the timing and severity of the burnings (i.e. being nearly absolute).

British author Hugh Thomas implied in his 1995 book that Hitler and Braun could have escaped using body doubles. However, Thomas concluded that Hitler was strangled to death by Linge, obscured by purportedly fraudulent forensic evidence. English historian Luke Daly-Groves points out that such conclusions are "extremely dubious" and lack supporting evidence.

In his 1995 book on Hitler's death, German historian Anton Joachimsthaler criticized the 1947 book for implying (in its discussion of a double, summary of government reports and conclusion) that Hitler escaped—possibly with his secretary Martin Bormann and/or plundered Nazi gold—to the Alps, Japan, or South America. Contrary to Musmanno's report, Joachimsthaler asserts that the Soviets did not allow U.S. intelligence to search the garden and that Heimlich modeled his sifting narrative upon the actual method the Soviets used to find the dental remains.

In 2019, Daly-Groves noted in a review of declassified American intelligence files that some information about investigations of Hitler's death was kept from Heimlich "because higher-ranking American intelligence officers were aware that he was attempting to capitalise on sensational rumours". Daly-Groves contends that Heimlich's statements in the book proved the suspicions of higher-ranking U.S. Army officers to be correct, and that Heimlich's arguments demonstrate he was not fully informed of the evidence. In 2020, historian Richard J. Evans stated that Heimlich resented "being side-lined in favour of Trevor-Roper's investigation [and was] ill informed" and also that the story about Hitler being murdered on Himmler's orders "has never been taken seriously by historians".
