= Buro =

Buro may refer to:

== Places ==
- Burao, a city in Somaliland
- Buro, the Ingush name for Vladikavkaz

== People ==
- Burro Banton or Buro Banton, born Donovan Spalding (born 1956), Jamaican dancehall reggae deejay popular in the mid-1980s and 1990s
- Edi Buro (born 1987), Bosnian footballer
- John J. Buro, American sportswriter, author, screenwriter and lyricist

== Food ==
- Burong isda, fermented fish and rice in Filipino cuisine
- Burong mangga, pickled mangoes in Filipino cuisine
- Tapai, fermented rice known in some Filipino languages as buro ("pickled")

== See also ==
- Buro 24/7, Russian digital company founded by Miroslava Duma
- Buros, a commune in the Pyrénées-Atlantiques department in southwestern France
- Büro, Büro ("Office, Office"), a German comedy television series
- Politburo, or political bureau, the executive committee for communist parties
