= Rapid Realty =

Real estate company

Rapid Realty NYC
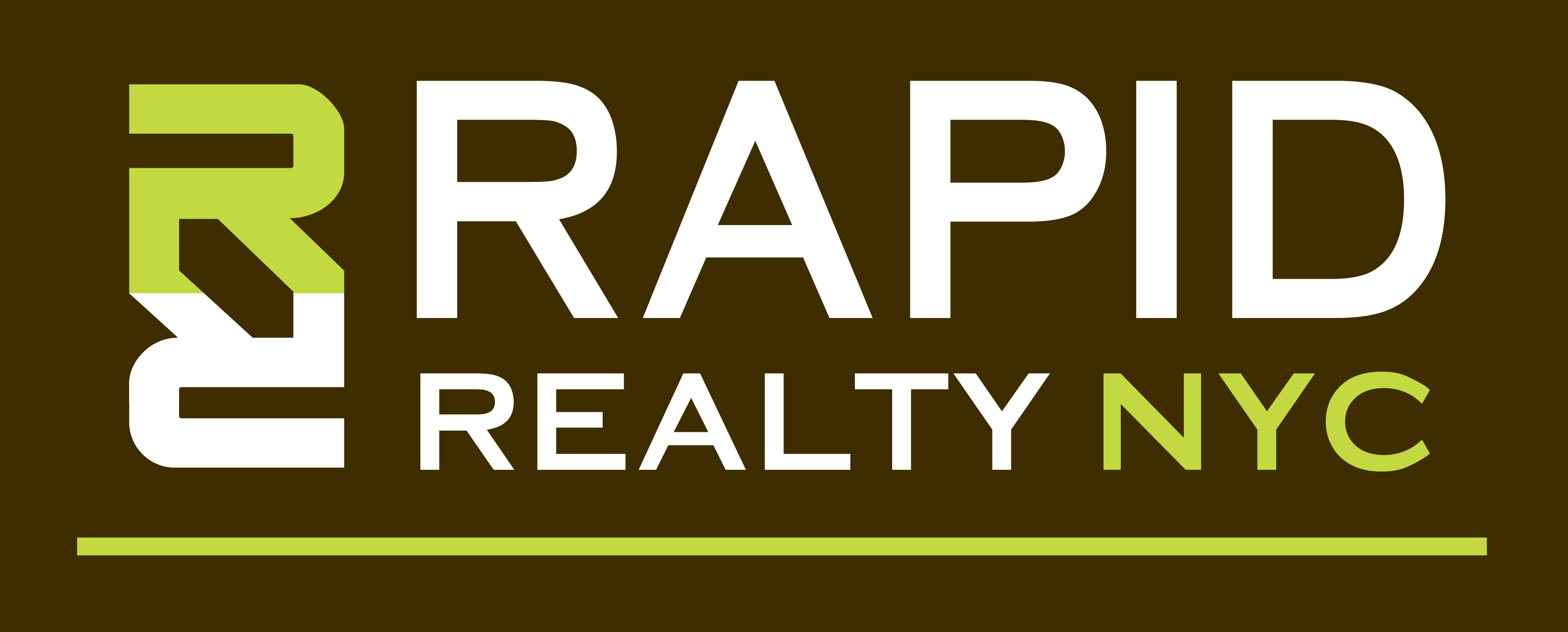
- Company type: Private
- Industry: Real estate
- Founded: Park Slope, Brooklyn 2009
- Founder: Anthony Lolli
- Headquarters: New York City
- Number of locations: 65 (December 2013)
- Website: rapidnyc.com

Rapid Realty NYC was a rental-based real estate brokerage in New York City. Anthony Lolli, the company's founder and CEO, started the company in 1998. The company was based in Brooklyn. As of December 2013, Rapid Realty had 65 offices.

Rapid Realty NYC was the first rental brokerage in New York to utilize a business franchise model. After many legal battles and fines issued by the state of New York, Rapid Realty is no longer in operation and Anthony Lolli has sold the company to get out from under the guise of Rapid Realty.

== History ==
Rapid Realty NYC was founded as a real estate agency in 1998 by Anthony Lolli, when he opened the first Rapid Realty in Park Slope, Brooklyn. The company's first franchise opened in Bay Ridge, Brooklyn in 2009. The company has 65 locations with an office in Boston.

In 2013, it was reported that Rapid Realty would give a pay increase to its brokers that get a tattoo of the company's logo.

Also in 2013, Leopard Films began producing a reality television show that focuses on the brokerage.

In 2018, Lolli sold Rapid Realty to Yves Jean-Baptiste. In 2023, Jean-Baptiste filed a lawsuit in New York State Supreme Court against Lolli and other past executives, claiming company leadership unlawfully sold him a franchise and withheld crucial financial and legal information.

== Recognition ==
In 2012, Rapid Realty was named one of the city's best firms to work for by real estate newspaper, The Real Deal. The company was recognized with Inc. Magazine's 2012 Inc 5000 award. In 2013, it was awarded Franchisee Satisfaction Award by the Franchise Business Review.
