= John Jay Educational Campus =

Public school in New York City

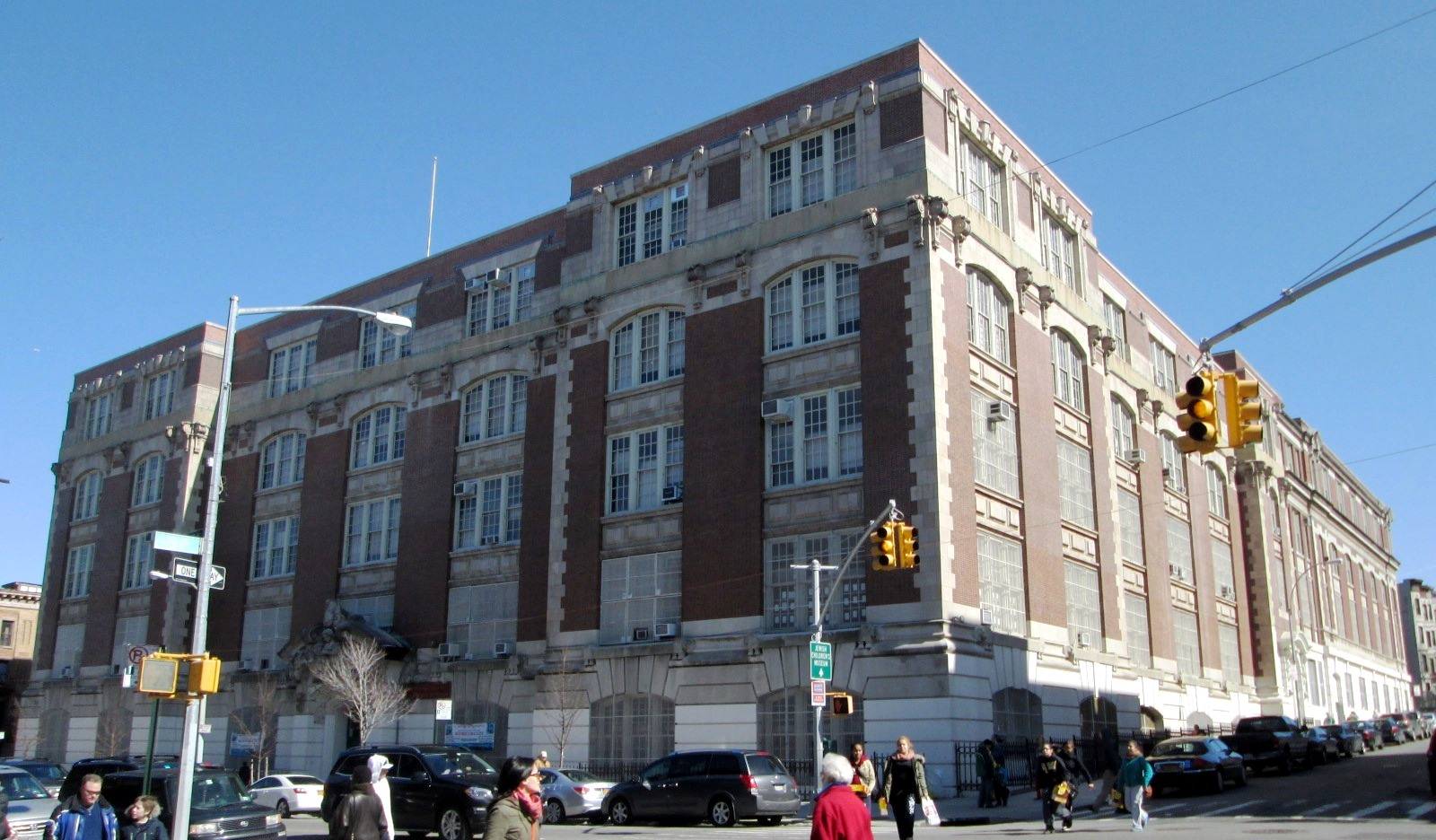

Location
- 237 7th Avenue; Brooklyn, New York City, New York 11215; United States; 40.669429599°N 73.9788092°W

The John Jay Educational Campus is a New York City Department of Education facility at 237 Seventh Avenue between 4th and 5th Streets in the Park Slope neighborhood of Brooklyn, New York City. Formerly the location of John Jay High School (originally Manual Training High School), which was closed in 2004 due to poor student performance, the facility now houses John Jay School for Law (K462), Cyberarts Studio Academy (K463), Park Slope Collegiate (K464, formerly the Secondary School for Research) and Millennium Brooklyn High School (K684).

The building was constructed in 1902. It was designed by C. B. J. Snyder in the Modern French Renaissance style.

== Notable alumni ==
- Zaid Abdul-Aziz, professional basketball player.
- Sal Albanese, politician
- Jean-Michel Basquiat, artist
- John J. Buro, sports writer.
- Linwood G. Dunn, pioneer of visual special effects in motion pictures.
- Henri Ford, pediatric surgeon.
- Anthony Lolli, real estate developer.
- Davi Napoleon, née Davida Skurnick, theater historian and arts journalist
- Sam Parrilla, Major League Baseball outfielder for Philadelphia Phillies
- Joe Pepitone, major league baseball player, notably with the New York Yankees.
- Isidor Isaac Rabi, recipient of the 1944 Nobel Prize in Physics.
- Doc Rankin, cartoonist
- Thelma Ritter, actress.
- Jack Ryan, Basketball player and NYC streetball legend.
- Nitty Scott, rapper.
- Alexander Scourby, actor.
- Harry Sylvester, and American author and journalist, recipient of the O. Henry Prize.
- Henny Youngman, comedian.

== See also ==
- List of high schools in New York City
