= William F. Heimlich =

American journalist and intelligence officer

William F. "Bill" Heimlich (September 28, 1911 – June 1, 1996) was an American intelligence officer and director of the RIAS (Rundfunk im amerikanischen Sektor, "Radio in the American Sector") after World War II.

== Life and career ==
Heimlich, a native of Ohio, worked as a radio broadcaster during his time at Ohio State University, becoming a senior staff member of University Radio (WOSU) and receiving a national award for best radio documentary.

After receiving degrees in political science and European history, Heimlich was called to active duty in 1941 and served as an infantry officer in Europe, where he fought in the Battle of the Bulge. Later, he was with the first American troops to enter Berlin in 1945.

In Berlin, he was the assistant chief of staff for U.S. intelligence operations, before being appointed director of RIAS:Berlin by General Lucius D. Clay in early 1948, a position that he retained until 1949. Heimlich transferred to the Air Force in the mid-1950s, and completed his active duty as a colonel, retiring from the reserve in 1971. In his military career, he was awarded the Bronze Star and the Army and Air Force Commendation medals, as well as awards from the French and Belgian governments.

Heimlich settled in the Washington, D.C. area in 1951, where he worked as an investigator and consultant for the Senate Foreign Relations Committee and other congressional committees. During the Eisenhower administration, he was the public affairs director for the Office of Civil and Defense Mobilization.

Beginning in 1961, Heimlich was a vice president of the Association of National Advertisers, where he helped in establishing the National Council of Better Business Bureaus. He retired in 1976. After his retirement, Heimlich volunteered with what became the Arts Council of Fairfax County, becoming a board member, and its president in the mid-1970s.

== Death of Adolf Hitler ==
In mid-December 1945, the Soviets allowed the U.S., Britain and France to investigate the Reich Chancellery bunker complex grounds, although this was cut short by the Soviets after one day. Heimlich reputedly led an American private intelligence detail to learn facts related to the death of Adolf Hitler. According to Heimlich, his final report to Washington on his investigation found "no proof of Hitler's death in Berlin in 1945". In his introduction to the 1947 book Who Killed Hitler?, edited by Herbert Moore and James W. Barrett, Heimlich claimed that he was not "able to find any evidence that [Hitler's] body was burned", and that he could not find "any persons who witnessed Hitler's last days in the Reischschancellory". Heimlich went on to claim that he could not find "any reliable witness of Hitler's activities after April 22, 1945—nine days before the date of his supposed suicide".

On May 25, 1952, statements by Heimlich about Hitler's death appeared in the National Police Gazette, an American tabloid-style magazine, and several days later in Germany's Darmstädter Tageblatt. Heimlich claimed that he had investigated the facts of Hitler's demise, and had found no concrete evidence supporting his death, only rumors. He claimed that the blood on the couch where Hitler shot himself was human blood, but the blood type was neither Hitler's or Eva Braun's. He further claimed that his investigators had thoroughly sifted through the dirt of the Chancellery garden and found "no traces of any human bodies" and "no traces of any burning" of bodies. In fact, the Germans conducted the digging during the day's investigation. According to historian Anton Joachimsthaler, Heimlich's dubious description of the process matches what the Russians themselves did, in the process finding Hitler's and Braun's dentures.

Pursuant to declassified American intelligence files reviewed by historian Luke Daly-Groves, certain information was kept from Heimlich as to the investigations of Hitler's death "...because higher-ranking American intelligence officers were aware that he was attempting to capitalise on sensational rumours". Daly-Groves contends these suspicions of the higher-ranking US Army officers turned out to be correct, given Heimlich statements in the book, Who Killed Hitler? and further that Heimlich's arguments show that he was not fully informed pursuant to the evidence. In 2020, historian Richard J. Evans stated that Heimlich resented "being side-lined in favour of Trevor-Roper's investigation ... [and was] ill informed" and also that the story about Hitler being murdered on Himmler's orders "has never been taken seriously by historians".

== Personal life ==
In 1951, Heimlich married the German dancer and cabaret artist Christina Ohlsen, whom he met in Berlin in 1945.

Heimlich died of a stroke in 1996. His memories of his time in occupied Berlin and as director of the RIAS, as well as the beginning of his love affair with his future wife were published in 2000 in the book Heimlich im Kalten Krieg ("Secretly in the Cold War") by Tamara Donentat and his widow, with the help of Heimlich's notes. After they settled in the United States, Ohlsen taught dance and was a founder and the director of the annual International Children's Festival at Wolf Trap National Park for the Performing Arts.
