= Anthony Lolli =

Real estate developer, founder of Rapid Realty

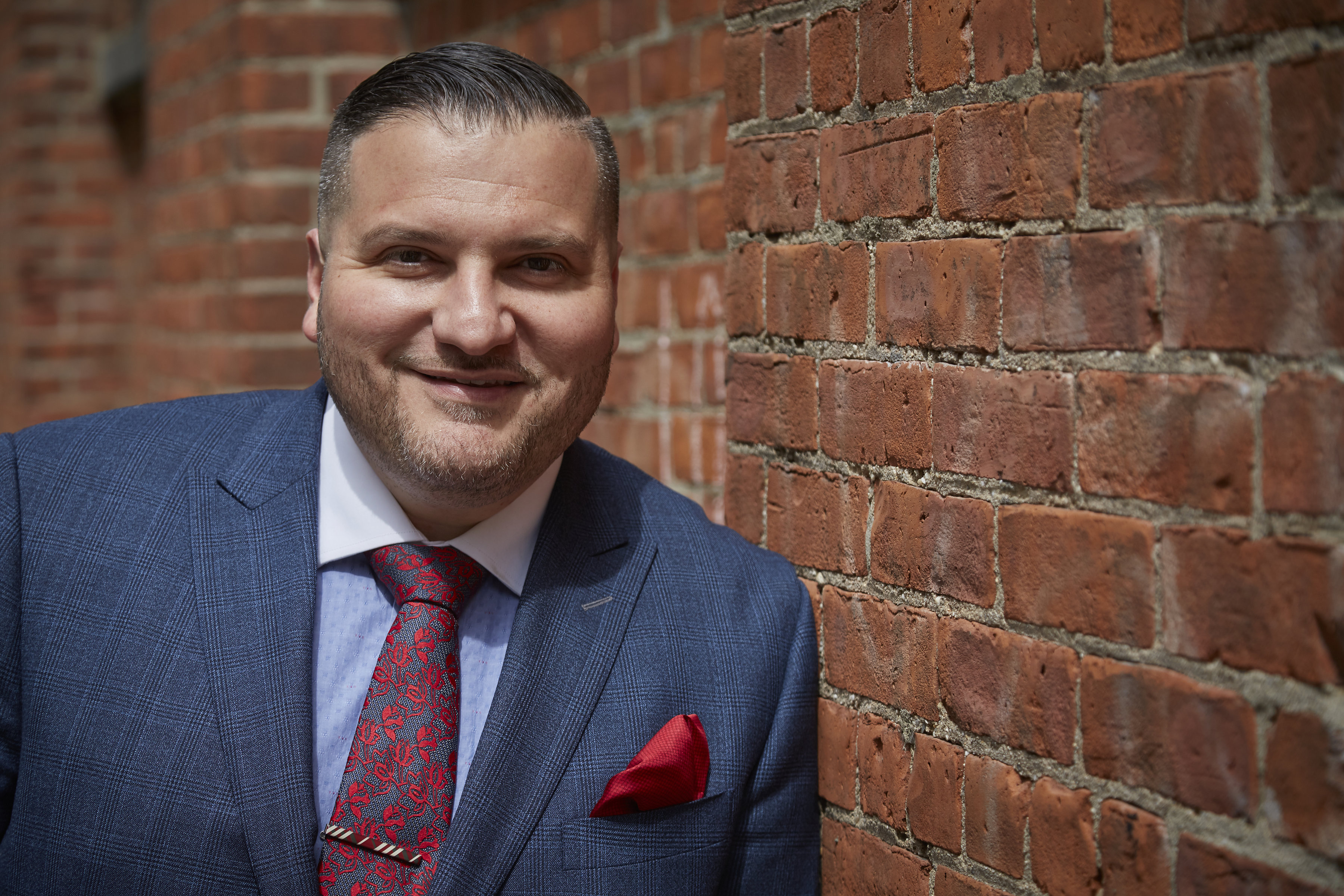
- Occupation: Real estate developer
- Known for: Founder and CEO of Rapid Realty

Anthony Lolli is a real estate developer and founder of the Brooklyn-based brokerage firm Rapid Realty.

== Youth and education ==
Anthony Lolli was born in New York City. His father was a teacher and his mother immigrated from Ecuador. Lolli attended John Jay High School and then went to Brooklyn-based Kingsborough College.

== Real estate career ==
He entered the real estate industry in 1998, at the age of 19. He founded Rapid Realty at the age of 21. According to Lolli, in 2009, Rapid Realty became the first rental-based real-estate franchise system in the US. Lolli has stated that franchising became necessary for growth, because it gave top sales talent the opportunity to own their own business rather than simply managing it.

In 2013, the company expanded to California and Massachusetts. By 2014, Rapid Realty had become the largest rental-based real estate brokerage in New York City. The company uses an "assembly line" style sales process, wherein the commission generated from a transaction is split among multiple agents who each played a different role in the deal, as well as their franchisees, and the parent company. Lolli has stated that he hires people with no previous experience, claiming that they have not yet developed any bad habits. That year, Rapid Realty began a policy where sales agents who received a tattoo of the Rapid Realty logo would receive a raise.

Lolli also founded Express Real Estate School, which trains licensed real estate agents. In addition to his rental agency company, Lolli has owned investment properties and a vacation home in Ecuador.

== Recognition ==
In 2013, Lolli won Golden Bridge's Entrepreneur of the Year Award, the first real estate businessperson to receive the award. He also received a Silver Stevie Award from the International Business Awards.

== Publications ==
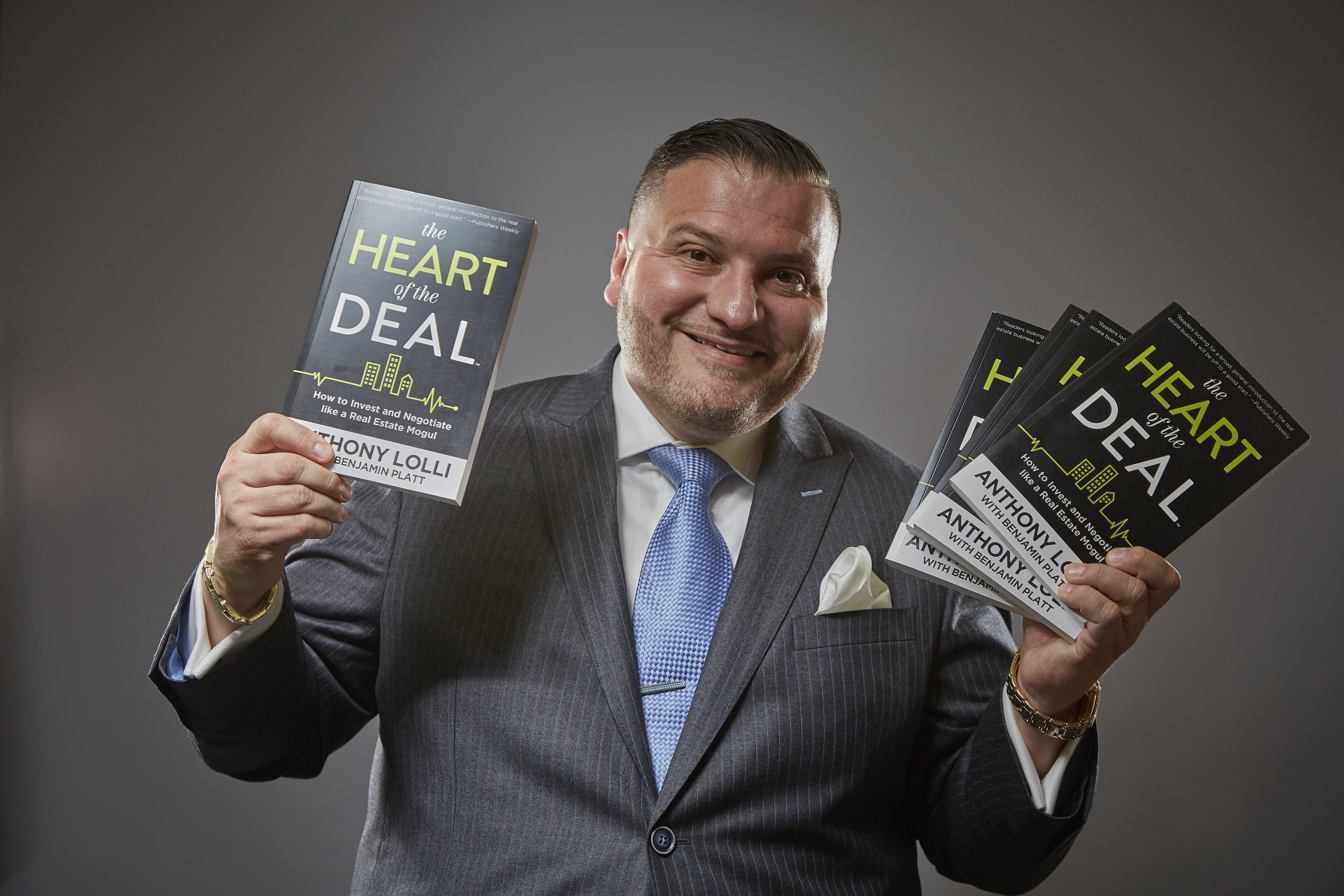
The Heart of the Deal

Lolli's first book, The Heart of the Deal, a memoir of his career in real estate as well as a guide to investing, was published in June 2017.

== Personal life ==
In January 2014, Lolli became an advisor to the Brooklyn Borough President Eric Adams. The hip-hop artist 50 Cent filmed commercials for his energy drinks at Lolli's home, located in Bay Ridge.
