= Jack Straw (rebel leader) =

Peasants' Revolt leader

Jack Straw (probably the same person as John Rakestraw or Rackstraw) was one of the three leaders (together with John Ball and Wat Tyler) of the Peasants' Revolt of 1381, a major event in the history of England.

== Biography ==
Little is known of the revolt's leaders. It has been suggested that Jack Straw may have been a preacher. Some have argued that the name was in fact a pseudonym for Wat Tyler or one of the other peasants' leaders; all of them appear to have used pseudonyms, adding to the confusion.

Several chroniclers, including Henry Knighton, mention Straw, though Knighton confuses him with Tyler. Thomas Walsingham stated that Straw was a priest and was the second-in-command of the rebels from Bury St Edmunds and Mildenhall. This story is most likely a result of confusion with a John Wrawe, an unbeneficed priest who was formerly the vicar of Ringsfield near Beccles in Suffolk, and who seems to have led the Suffolk insurgency. Walsingham also states that Straw and his followers murdered both notable local figures in Bury and, after reaching the capital, several of its Flemish residents, an accusation also made by Froissart. However, according to information in the church of St Mary in Great Baddow, in Essex, England, Jack Straw led an ill-fated crowd from the churchyard there to the risings, and he is elsewhere referred to as the leader of the men from Essex (as opposed to Tyler, who led the rebels from Kent).

Straw is generally supposed to have been executed in 1381 along with the other main figures of the Revolt. Froissart states that after Wat Tyler's death at Smithfield, Straw (along with John Ball) was found "in an old house hidden, thinking to have stolen away", and beheaded. Walsingham gives a lengthy (and most likely invented) confession in which Straw states that the insurgents' plans were to kill the king, "all landowners, bishops, monks, canons, and rectors of churches", set up their own laws, and set fire to London.

The later chronicles of Raphael Holinshed and John Stow, in addition to detailing the confession, repeat a story, originating in the 15th-century account of Richard Fox, that Jack Straw, alias John Tyler, was provoked into his actions by an assault perpetrated on his daughter by a tax collector.

== Jack Straw in English culture ==
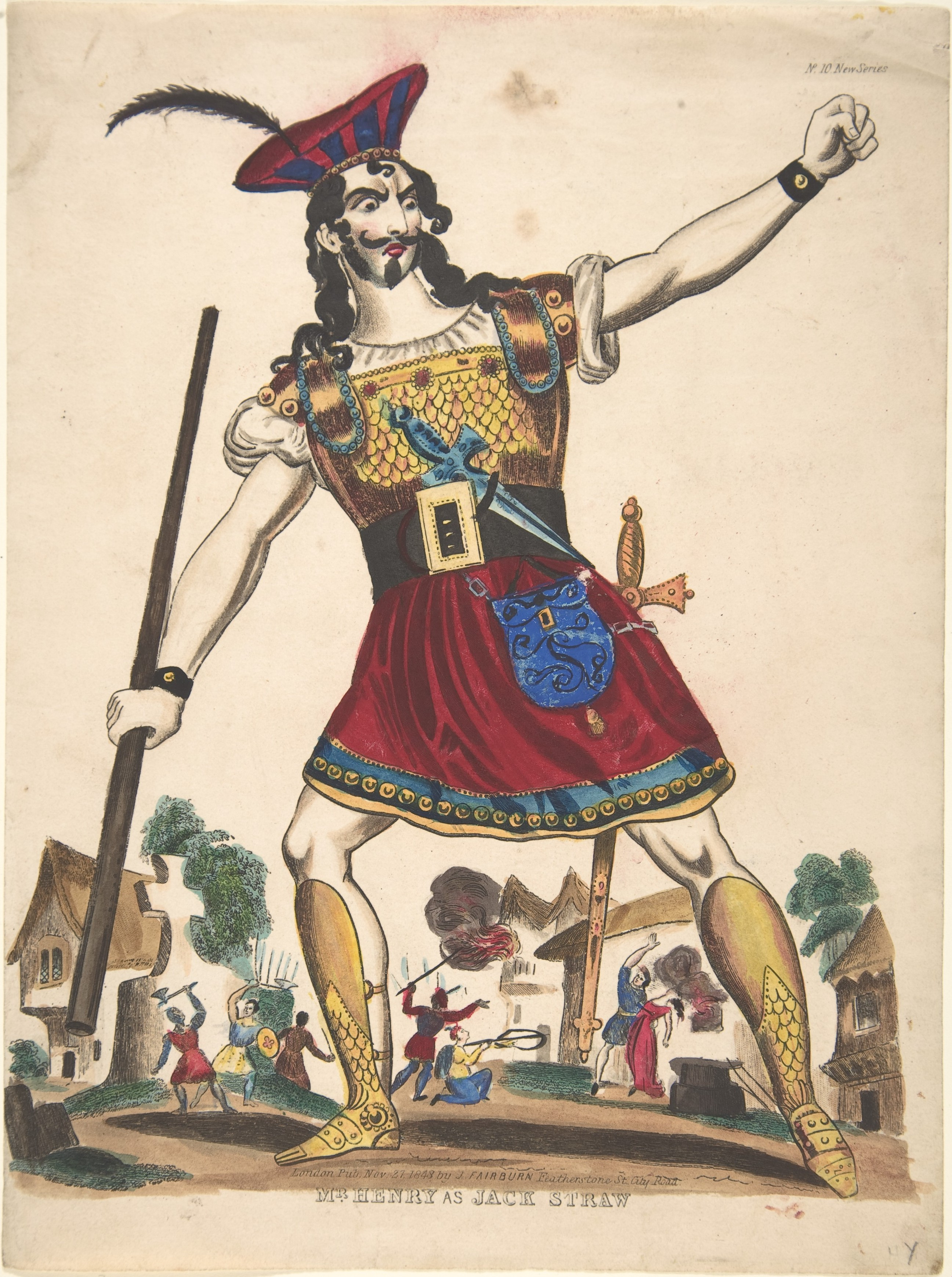
19th-century actor in costume as Jack Straw

Whether Straw was a real person, a pseudonym for Tyler, or simply a result of confusion on the part of chroniclers remote from the events they were describing, he went on to become a part of the popular narrative of the revolt. Jack Straw and the other rebel leaders are introduced in John Gower's Vox Clamantis Book I Chapter XI. The defeat of the rebels is covered in Chapter XIX. Macaulay's notes to Vox include Thomas Fuller's translation of the Chapter XI passage.

Tom comes thereat, when called by Wat, and Simm as forward we find,
Bet calls as quick to Gibb and to Hykk, that neither would tarry behind.
Gibb, a good whelp of that litter, doth help mad Coll more mischief to do,
And Will he does vow, the time is come now, he'll join in their company too.
Davie complains, whiles Grigg gets the gains, and Hobb with them does partake,
Lorkin aloud in the midst of the crowd conceiveth as deep is his stake.
Hudde doth spoil whom Judde doth foil, and Tebb lends his helping hand,
But Jack the mad patch men and houses does snatch, and kills all at his command.

—

Gower's lines were parodied by Geoffrey Chaucer. Straw is mentioned in The Nun's Priest's Tale of The Canterbury Tales, as the leader of a mob targeting foreign workers:

Certes, he Jakke Straw and his meinee
Ne made nevere shoutes half so shrille,
Whan that they wolden any Fleming kille.

Straw was central to an anonymous 1593 play dramatising the events of the Rising, The Life and Death of Jack Straw. In the modern era, the rather confused reporting of events was briefly satirised in Sellar and Yeatman's parody of Edwardian-era popular history, 1066 and All That, stating that the peasants revolted "in several reigns under such memorable leaders as Black Kat, Straw Hat, John Bull and What Tyler?", with objectives including "to find out [...] which of them was the Leader of the Rebellion".

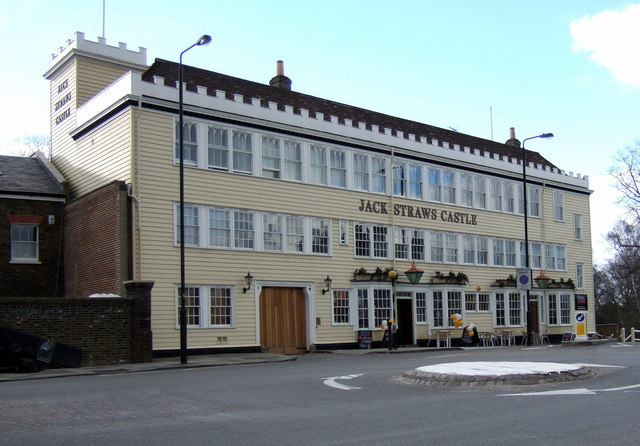
Jack Straw's Castle

Straw was commemorated in the name of a pub on the edge of Hampstead Heath, London, which closed in 2002. The Jack Straw's Castle, reputed to be the highest pub in London, took its name from a story that Straw addressed groups of rebels on the Heath from a hay wagon which became known as "Jack Straw's Castle".

The British politician Jack Straw (born John Whitaker Straw, 1946) adopted the name "Jack", reportedly after the rebel leader.
