= Fox (boat) =

Surfboat to be rowed across the Atlantic Ocean

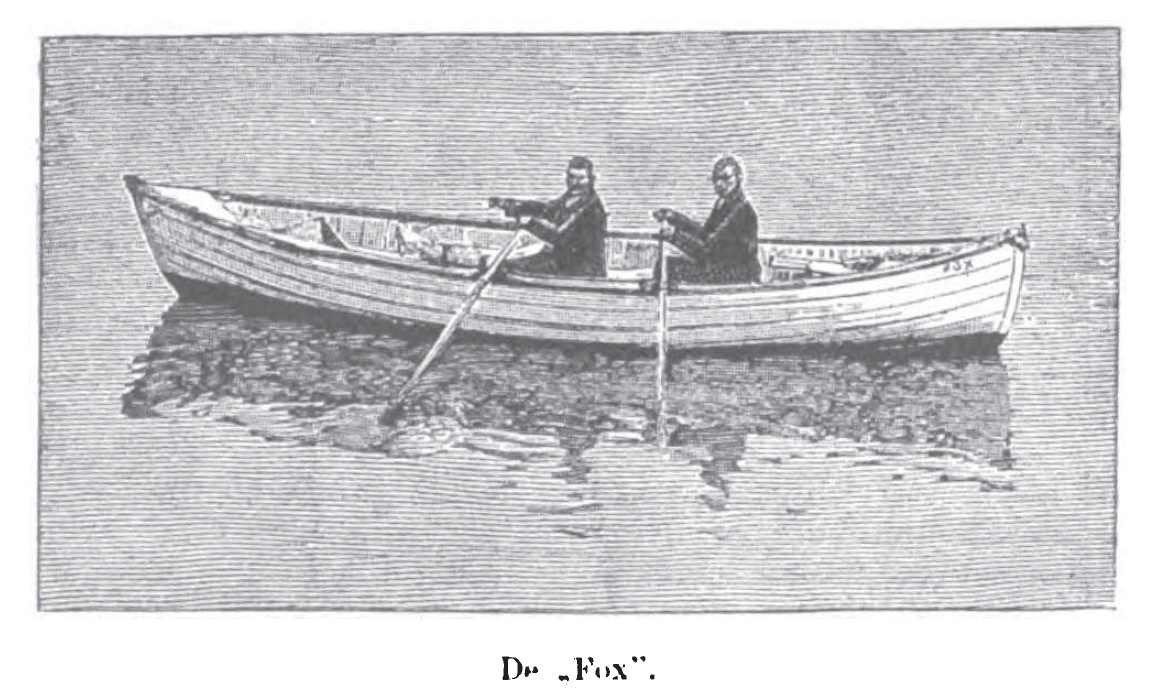
Fox surfboat

Fox was a specially built surfboat to be rowed across the Atlantic Ocean.

Fox was custom built in 1896 by William A. Seaman at Seaman Sea Skiffs of Branchport, New Jersey for Frank Samuelsen and George Harbo of Highlands, New Jersey. The boat was named Fox for the financial backer Richard Kyle Fox (1846-1922) owner of the "pink tabloid", Police Gazette.

William A. Seaman was well known for building the seaworthy Nauvoo surf boat. He built the Fox with watertight compartments and hand rails on the keel, for righting the boat if capsized at sea. This feature would be used at least once in the middle of the Atlantic Ocean during heavy seas.

The original Fox is lost, but in 1975 a replica of the Fox was built by the Long Branch Ice Boat and Yacht Club (LBIBYC) of New Jersey with the participation of Harold L. Seaman, son of the boat builder. As a youngster, Harold Seaman backed-up most of the rivets during construction of the original Fox. At age 91, he provided a full set of plans reconstructed "from old photographs, shop records and memory, lines and measurements, correct within a fraction of an inch" .

== See also ==
- Jersey Skiff
