= H. C. Witwer =

American comic strip and short story writer

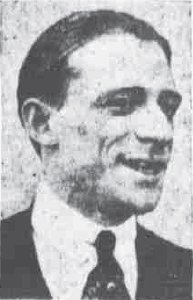
- Born: Harry Charles Witwer; March 11, 1890; Athens, Pennsylvania
- Died: August 9, 1929 (aged 39); Los Angeles
- Occupations: Short story author screenwriter cartoonist

Harry Charles Witwer (March 11, 1890 – August 9, 1929), more commonly known as H. C. Witwer, was an American short-story author. Some 60 comedy film shorts were based on his works, most from the mid-1920s to 1930, the year after Witwer's death.

== Biography ==
Witwer was born on March 11, 1890, in Athens, Pennsylvania, and briefly attended Saint Joseph's College in Philadelphia. He worked in odd jobs—errand boy for a butcher, prize fighter manager, and a soda jerk on Broadway—for a time before starting to write for newspapers, counting the St. Cloud (Florida) Tribune and New York City newspapers Brooklyn Eagle, the New York American, the New York Mail, and The Sun as employers.

In 1912, he married Zada "Sadie" Schagrin of Yonkers, New York. His first recorded film contribution at the Internet Movie Database (IMDb) was writing intertitles for the 1916 silent film Where D'Ye Get That Stuff?. In 1917—during World War I—he was sent to France by Collier's magazine as a war correspondent. He also wrote for McClure's in this time period.

By the early 1920s, Witwer's works were starting to be filmed, with nearly 30 film credits recorded by the IMDb by 1925. In May 1925, his income was reportedly more than that of Ring Lardner. Witwer is credited with producing ten shorts beginning in 1925, but he was most active as a writer, receiving writing credits for 30 more short films after 1925.

In the mid-1920s, Witwer collaborated on two newspaper comic strips. In 1924, he began the strip Samson and Delia with Tim Early and Paul Robinson, which ran for two years. In 1925, he created Switchboard Sally with Wesley Morse.

Witwer relocated to California in 1926 to regain his health, which he apparently did, remaining in good health until he fell ill in May 1929.

== Harold Lloyd lawsuit ==
Witwer sued Harold Lloyd in April 1929 for $2,300,000 over Lloyd's 1925 film The Freshman, claiming that it was "pirated" from Witwer's short story "The Emancipation of Rodney", first published in 1915. By the time Witwer died from liver failure in Los Angeles, on August 9, 1929, the lawsuit had not been settled. Witwer's widow pursued the lawsuit and won a judgement against Lloyd in November 1930. On appeal, the United States Court of Appeals overturned the ruling and Witwer's widow received nothing.

== Legacy ==
Most notable during his lifetime for his baseball and boxing stories, Witwer wrote some 400 stories and articles for magazines and some 125 film treatments throughout his career. In a 1999 review of an anthology of boxing short stories, which included Witwer's "The Chickasha Bone Crusher", reviewer Sybil S. Steinberg praised the "near-forgotten" Witwer, calling him one of "America's wittiest idiomatic stylists".

== Books ==
- From Baseball to Boches (1918)
- Alex the Great (1919)
- Arthur William Brown (1919)
- A Smile a Minute (1919)
- Best College Humor (1920), introduction
- Kid Scanlan (1920)
- The Leather Pushers (1921)
- The Rubyiat of a Freshman (1921)
- There's No Base Like Home (1923)
- Fighting Back (1924)
- Love and Learn: The Story of a Telephone Girl Who Loved Not Too Well But Wisely (1924)
- Bill Grimm's Progress (1926)
- Roughly Speaking (1926)
- The Classics in Slang (1927)
- Yes Man's Land (1929)
