= Bazooka Joe =

Bubble gum comic strip character

Bazooka Joe and his Gang
- Author: Jay Lynch (writer)
- Owner: Topps (1954–2022); Fanatics, Inc. (2022–23); Apax Partners (2023–present)
- Illustrator: Wesley Morse
- Website: bazookajoe.com
- Launch date: 1954; 72 years ago
- Genre: Cartoon
- Original language: English

Bazooka Joe and his Gang is a comic strip featured on small comics included in individually-wrapped pieces of Bazooka bubble gum. The main character, Bazooka Joe, wears a black eyepatch, lending him a distinctive appearance. He is one of the more recognizable American advertising characters of the 20th century, due to worldwide distribution, and one of the few associated with a candy.

== History ==
Sometime between 1953 and 1954, Woody Gelman and Ben Solomon, heads of Product Development at Topps, approached cartoonist Wesley Morse to create Bazooka Joe and his Gang. The character was named after a contest was held asking for suggestions.

In Heroes of the Comics: Portraits of the Pioneering Legends of Comic Books, Drew Friedman wrote: "Gelman, along with his friend and former co-animator Ben Solomon, created Popsicle Pete, who appeared in ads and packages for Popsicle ice pops for decades. Popsicle Pete caught the eye of president of the Topps Company, Arthur Shorin, who hired Gelman and Solomon to work for him full time in Brooklyn. Gelman worked as an editor and writer for Topps, and Solomon became its art director. Gelman soon became head of the new product development department, where he developed the Bazooka Joe mini-comics (drawn by Wesley Morse) and had his hand in many successful innovations for trading cards and other products."

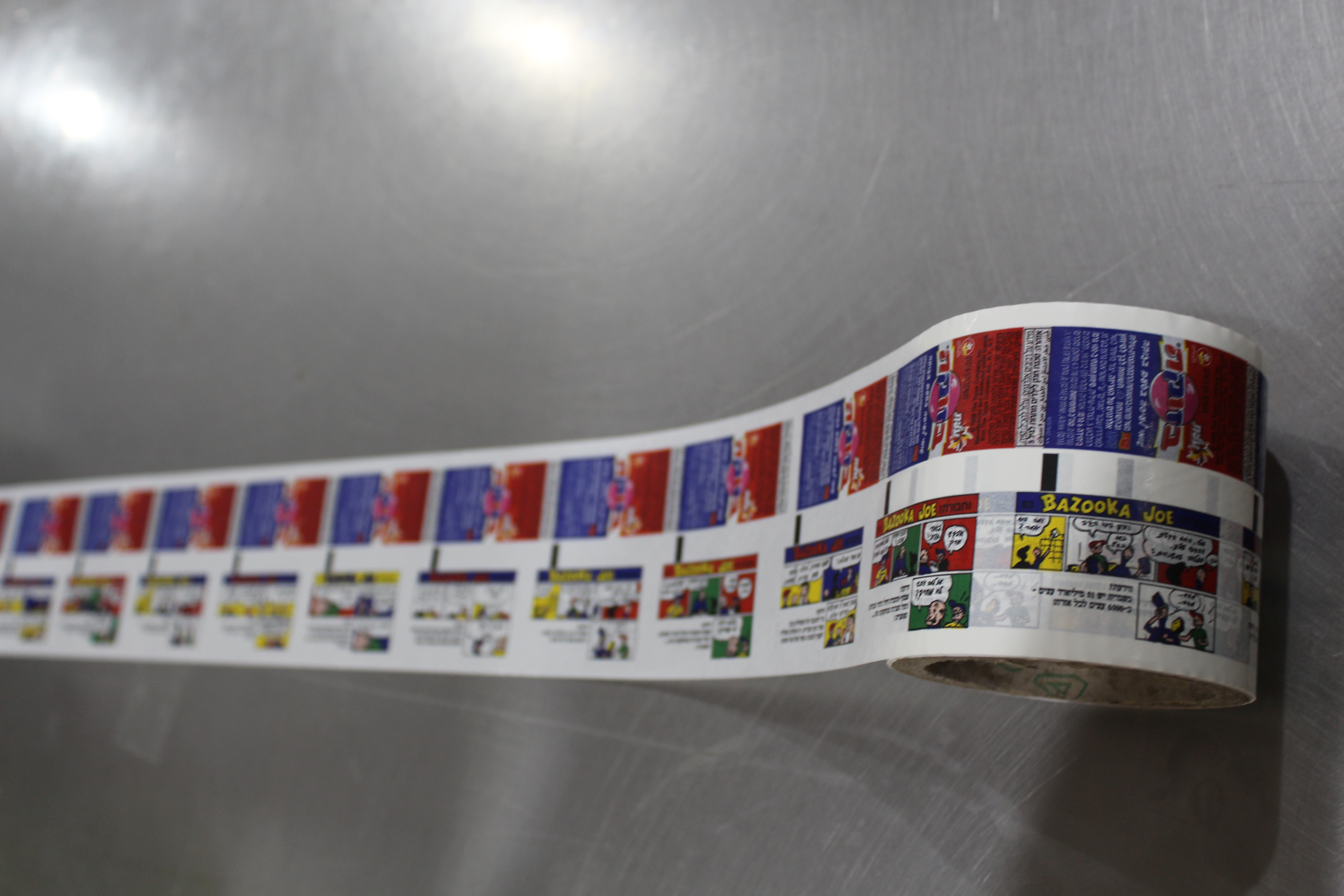
Production of Bazooka packaging and comic strips at the Elite factory in Nazareth Illit, Israel

Bazooka Joe's style changed with the times. By the 1990s, Joe had adopted a more contemporary look, including low-slung, baggy jeans.

From 1967 to 1990, the main writer was cartoonist Jay Lynch.

Bazooka Joe comics were localized or translated for sale in other countries. For example, the Canadian version featured bilingual (simultaneous English and French) text balloons.

With sales of Bazooka bubble gum down, Bazooka Candy Brands announced in November 2012 that they would no longer include the comic strip in their packaging. The new wrapper would include brain teasers, instructions, and codes that could be used to unlock videos and video games. The company stated that Bazooka Joe and other characters would occasionally appear on the new packaging. The comic strip was restored in 2019.

== Characters and story ==
Bazooka Joe is joined in his various misadventures by a motley crew of characters, who came from the tradition of syndicated kid gang comic strips, such as Gene Byrnes' Reg'lar Fellers and Ad Carter's Just Kids. The group includes:

- Pesty (formerly Orville), Joe's younger brother, with a 1950s cowboy sombrero
- Mort, a gangly boy who always wears his red turtleneck sweater pulled up over his mouth
- Hungry Herman, Joe's tubby pal
- Jane, Joe's girlfriend
- Tuffy, a streetwise type who wears a sailor hat
- Walkie Talkie, a neighborhood mutt

The comics generally consist of child-friendly jokes, as well as small advertisements for kitschy merchandise one could obtain in exchange for comics and a few cents or dollars. From the very beginning in 1954, the bottom of the comics included "fortunes" similar to those one would find in a fortune cookie, sometimes with a comedic bent.

=== Bazookaverse ===
In 2024, DC Comics and Bazooka made a crossover by releasing a series of eight digital comics, with the first one featuring Wonder Woman and Jane being released on March 8 to coincide with International Women's Day. It also featured DC characters Superman, Batman, Green Lantern, The Flash, and Aquaman. They were posted on Bazooka's official Instagram and Facebook, as well as ComicBook.com. Rebecca Silberfarb, Vice President of Marketing at Bazooka Companies, LLC. said: "“The BazookaverseTM celebrates the brand’s deeply rooted legacy in the comic world while delivering an immersive experience for fans everywhere to enjoy, coming together to collaborate with DC to kick start this series was such a great fit given both brands’ significant impact on pop culture. Today marks a huge milestone for Bazooka, and the adventure has only just begun!”

In September 2025, Bazooka released a limited-edition series of thirty-six comics featuring sports athletes Karl-Anthony Towns, Derrick White, CJ McCollum, Anders Lee, Adam Henrique, Freddie Freeman, Jason Kelce, CC Sabathia, Dak Prescott, DK Metcalf, Deja Kelly, and Flau'jae Johnson. Unlike the DC comics, these are physical and can be collected. Senior Brand Manager Joanna Firestone said: "Sports have always been a part of Bazooka's DNA – just like our iconic comics, by introducing this group of powerhouse athletes into the Bazookaverse, we are bringing pop culture to our comics with a modern twist on the same humor our fans love and expect from Bazooka Joe in a way that connects with all generations."
