= Richard K. Fox (pilot boat) =

Sandy Hook Pilot boat

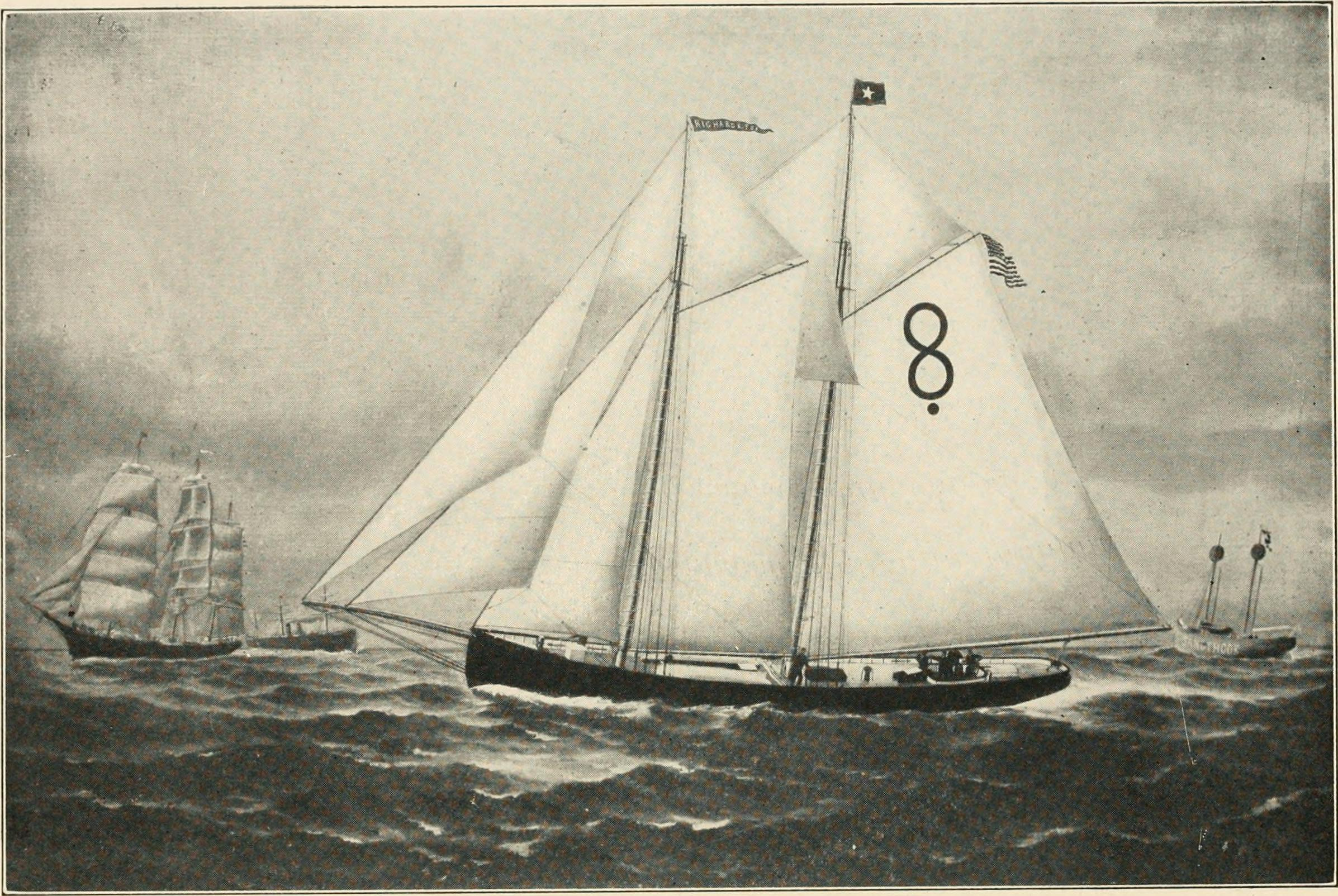
- Pilot Boat Richard K. Fox, No. 8

History

United States
- Name: Lillie
- Namesake: Richard Kyle Fox, sportsman and publisher of the Police Gazette
- Owner: Boston Pilots, George W. Lawler, James M. Dolliver; New York Pilots
- Operator: George W. Lawler, James L. Smith, John J. Canvin Jr.
- Builder: Pierce Montgomery & Howard
- Cost: $8,000
- Launched: May 20, 1876
- Out of service: February 1, 1896
- Renamed: Richard K. Fox
- Fate: Sold

General characteristics
- Class & type: schooner
- Tonnage: 79-tons TM; 47.68-tons BOM
- Length: 73 ft 11 in (22.53 m)
- Beam: 19 ft 10 in (6.05 m)
- Depth: 10 ft 0 in (3.05 m)
- Propulsion: Sail

The Richard K. Fox, first named Lillie, was a 19th-century pilot boat built in 1876 for Boston Pilots. She was designed by model by Dennison J. Lawlor. She was one of the most graceful and attractive of the Boston pilot-boats and represented a trend toward deep-bodied boats. She was later sold to the New York pilots and renamed Richard K. Fox in honor of the famous sportsman and publisher of the Police Gazette. In the age of steam, she was sold in 1896 to the Marine Hospital Service.

== Construction and service ==
=== Pilot boat Lillie ===
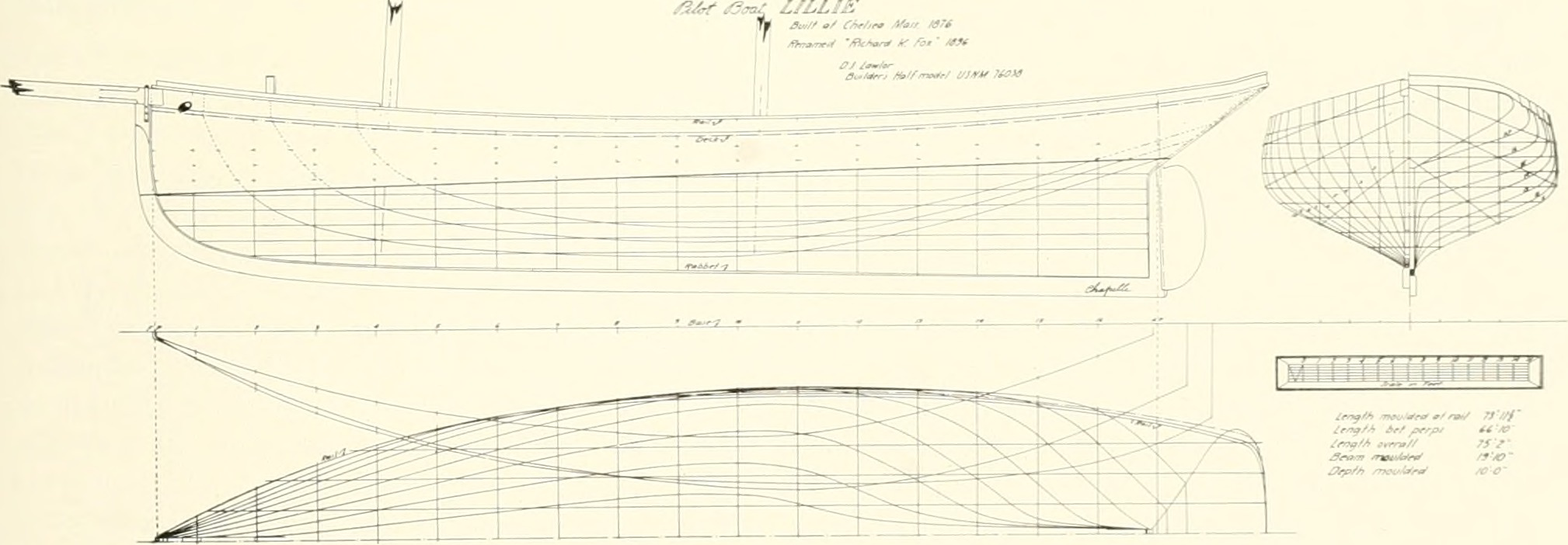
Lines of the Boston Pilot Lillie

The Boston pilot-boat Lillie, No. 1, was launched in Chelsea, Massachusetts on May 20, 1876. She was constructed by Pierce, Montgomery & Howard from a half-model made by prominent naval architect Dennison J. Lawlor of Chelsea. The half-model shows a pilot-boat with a low freeboard, a straight keel and rounded forefoot. Her dimensions were listed at: 73 feet and 11 inches, 19 feet 10 inches to beam, and 10 feet depth. She was built for Captain George W. Lawler, who was connected with the Boston pilot service for more than forty years. He named the Lillie after his mother. The Lillie was towed from Chelsea to the Atlantic Works wharf, East Boston. The schooner was described as one of the most graceful and well-built of pilot-boats.

On June 22, 1876, on her first trial trip, the pilot boat Lillie went down the Boston Harbor with a party of about seventy-five men and woman were on board, which were by invitation of Captain Lawler. Food and refreshments was served on board the boat.

On June 24, 1876, the pilot boat Centennial was on her trail trip when the Lillie was sited, and a race began between the two boats. The course of nine miles was from Boston Light to Minot's Ledge Light. The raced was cut short after six miles, when the Lillie, sighted the steamship China and took off for the ship.

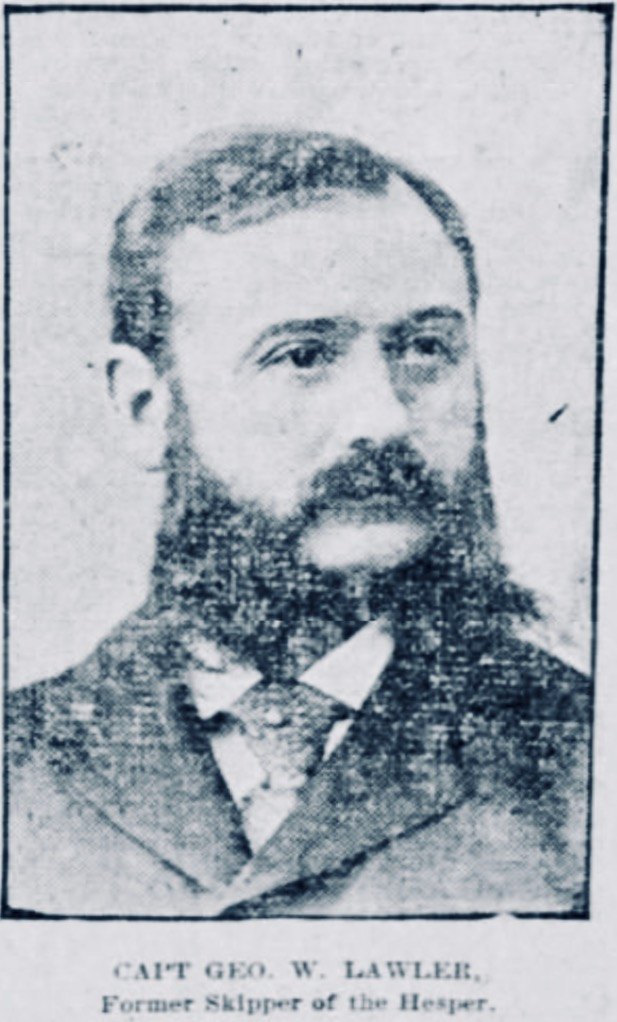
Boston Pilot George W. Lawler.

The Lillie was registered with the Index to Ship Registers from 1877 to 1892 to George W. Lawler as Master and to the Boston Pilots as the owners. She belonged to the Boston port. Her dimensions varied in different years of registration.

On January 25, 1879, the pilot-boat Lillie was caught out in Boston Bay by a 68-miles per-hour wind and stormy sea. Captain Lawler had to light a woolen cloth in kerosene to thaw the frozen ropes and sails. The Lillie survived the storm and was towed to the Gallops Island Wharf and then to her home in Boston. She was later sold c. 1884 to the New York pilots and renamed the Richard K. Fox.

On September 12, 1884, the pilot-boat Lillie No. 1 was sold to Captain James M. Dolliver. The price that was paid was $8,000.

One of the last reports from the pilot-boat Lillie was on June 8, 1890, when Pilot Nicolay of the Lillie hailed to the French steamship La Bourgogne, with her machinery out of order. The captain of the La Bourgogne handed to Pilot Nicolay a cable to be dispatch on reaching New York.

=== Pilot boat Richard K. Fox ===
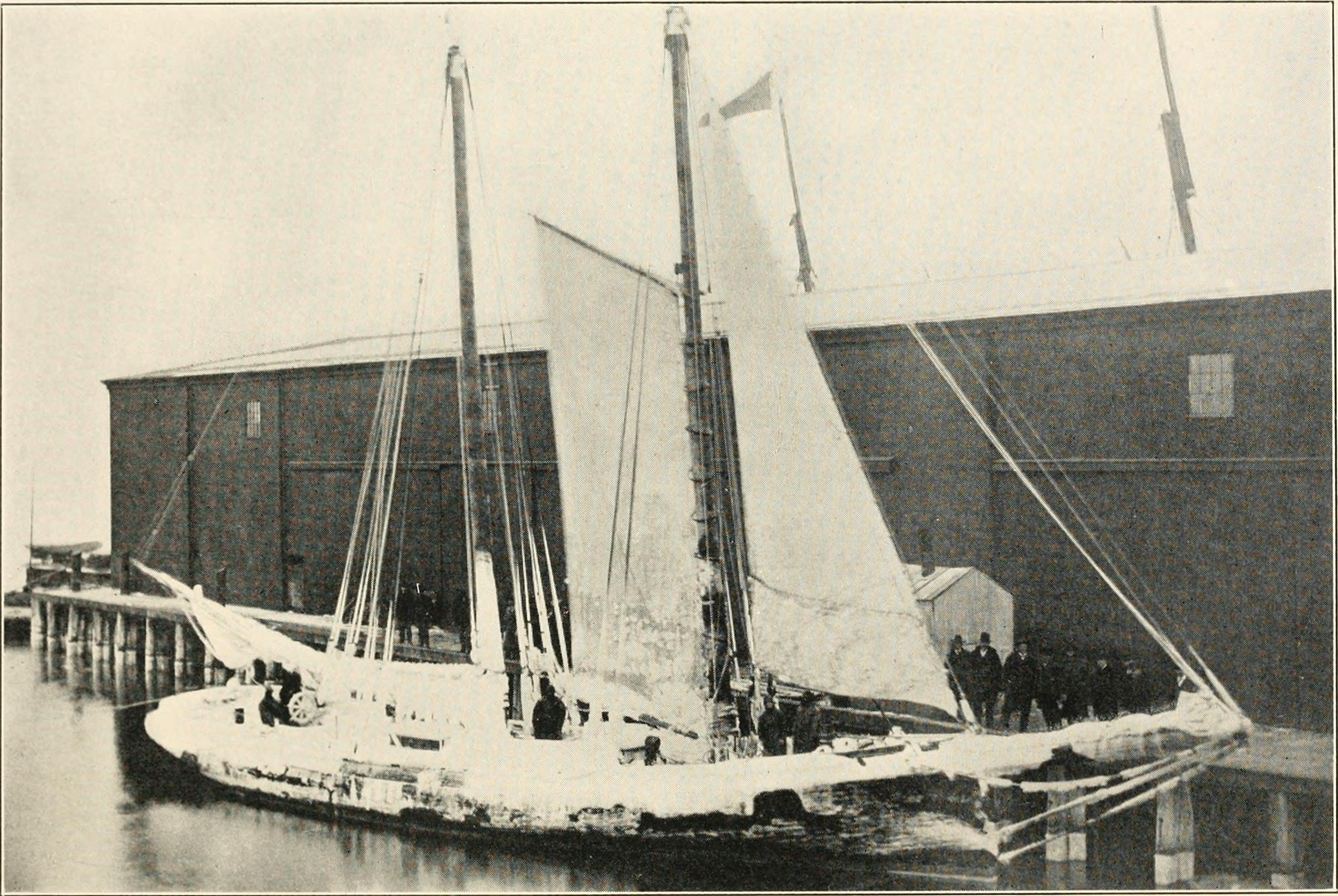
Pilot Boat Richard K. Fox in port after a winter cruise in zero weather.

When the Lillie was sold to the New York pilots, she was renamed the Richard K. Fox. The Fox was named in honor of Richard Kyle Fox, the famous sportsman and publisher of the Police Gazette.

The Fox was registered with the Record of American and Foreign Shipping from 1884 to 1887 as the Richard K. Fox. She was owned by Andrew Leighton. She weighed 78-tons. Her captain was Charles H. Harty.

One of the first reports of the pilot-boat Richard K. Fox was on November 19, 1891, when the steamboat Havana picked up a yawl from the pilot-boat Richard K. Fox that was on station duty east of Sandy Hook.

On February 14, 1895, the tank steamer Chester and the pilot-boat Richard K. Fox, No. 8, were long overdue due to the bad weather.

On February 14, 1895, the pilot-boat Richard K. Fox, No. 8, was wrecked on the Rockaway Shoals in a dense fog. The tug Argus picked up the pilot boat's yawl and seven of the crew near Coney Island en route to the mainland. The Fox was saved by the Rockaway Beach life-Saving Station at Coney Island. She was insured for $8,000. The Board of Pilot Commissioners reviewed the case of Pilot David S. Nicolay, who was in command of the Fox when she went ashore on Rockaway Shoals. Pilot John Shooks charged Nicolay with not staying with the boat, but abandoned the vessel. The issue was settled and Nicolay was cleared from the charge.

Captain John J. Canvin Jr., son of John Joseph Canvin, was a pilot on the pilot boat Richard K. Fox when he boarded the steamship Idaho. He died of heart disease shortly after climbing the robe ladder to board the vessel on September 19, 1897.

== End of service ==
On February 1, 1896, the New York Pilots discarded sixteen sailboats and moved them to the Erie Basin in Brooklyn. They were replaced with steam pilot boats. The Richard K. Fox was sold for $4,000. The Marine Hospital Service purchased the Richard K. Fox of New York for transporting mail and supplies from Cuba to the Marine hospital at Dry Tortugas near Key West.

== See also ==
- List of Northeastern U. S. Pilot Boats
