= Doc Rankin =

American army officer and cartoonist

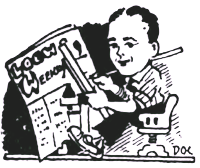
"Doc" Rankin in 1921, as staff cartoonist for Loew's Weekly.

Ainsworth H. "Doc" Rankin (November 27, 1896 – January 1954) was an American army officer and freelance cartoonist. He was an editorial page cartoonist for the Brooklyn Eagle for a number of years and is best known for producing the touring show This is the Army with Irving Berlin, which toured military camps during World War II. He is also widely believed by comic collectors to be the anonymous artist who produced nearly 200 "Tijuana bibles" for New York printers during a two-year period around 1935, based on an identification by sexologist, folklorist and bibliographer Gershon Legman. Legman claimed to have met Doc Rankin in a Scranton, Pennsylvania novelty shop and learned from him that he was one of the artists behind the popular, ribald 8-page cartoon booklets which were some of the earliest underground comics, drawn in a style resembling the later work of Robert Crumb.

The son of Dr. James B. Rankin, a Scottish physician, and his wife Louise, a daughter of the controversial Belfast preacher Rev. Hugh Hanna, Doc Rankin was born in Buffalo, New York and lived for six years in England as a boy before returning to New York City, where he graduated from Manual Training High School in Brooklyn in 1915. He enlisted in the Army National Guard in 1916 and served on the Mexican border with the 27th Division for ten months. He returned to active duty for the First World War in the Army's Chemical Warfare Service, serving in the same unit as Martin Branner, who would later go on to create the popular comic strip Winnie Winkle. He arrived in France in the final months of the war. After the armistice was signed Rankin remained with the Army of Occupation where he drew cartoons for the service newspapers and was a member of the 2nd Army Corps revue, a troupe of 26 performers that toured Europe entertaining the troops.

Returning to the US he was a reserve cavalry officer between the wars, while maintaining a freelance cartooning studio in Manhattan where he produced commercial art and cartoons, including the artwork for Tin Pan Alley sheet music. For many years he supplied editorial page cartoons for the daily Brooklyn Eagle, drawn in a dramatic conté crayon style similar to the work of Robert Minor, and unlike his humorous pen and ink gag cartoons.

Never widely known as a cartoonist, he retired from cartooning after his military call-up in 1940. He served during the Second World War as a Special Services officer with responsibilities for entertainment and camp morale, first at Camp Upton on Long Island, where he launched a camp newspaper before helping to put together the touring This is the Army show, followed by a stint at Camp Kilmer, and then overseas in Europe. He remained in the military after the war, rising to the rank of lieutenant colonel, and died of heart failure at Fort Bragg in 1954. He is buried in Fayetteville, North Carolina.
