= Richard Kyle Fox =

Irish-born American sports journalist (1846–1922)

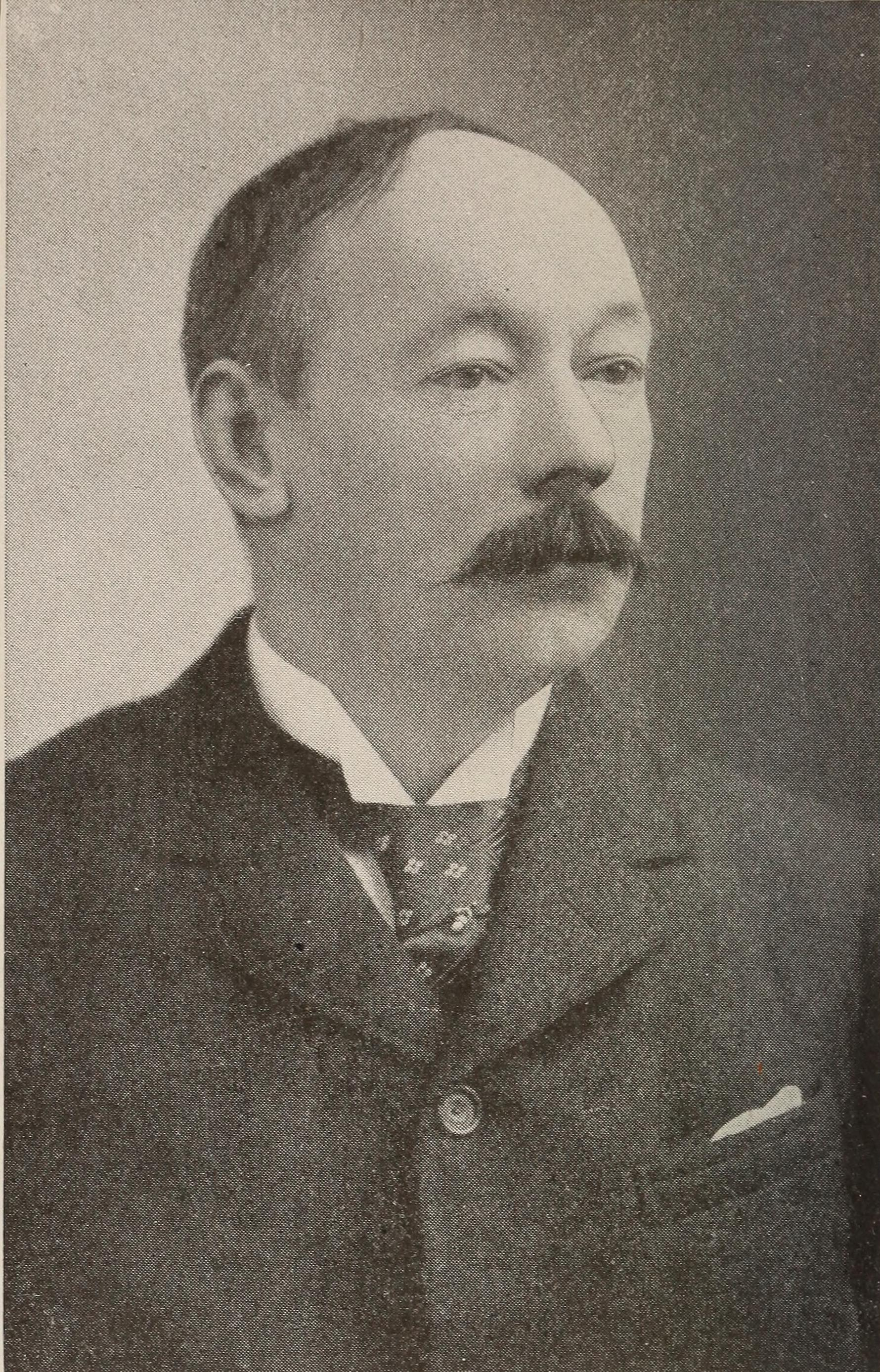
- Fox in 1908
- Born: August 12, 1846; Belfast, Ireland
- Died: November 15, 1922 (aged 76); The Bronx, New York City, US
- Resting place: Woodlawn Cemetery, Bronx, New York
- Occupations: Sports journalist, publisher, promoter

Richard Kyle Fox (August 12, 1846 – November 15, 1922) was an Irish-born American sports journalist, publisher and promoter.

== Biography ==
Fox was born on August 12, 1846, in Belfast, to James and Mary Fox (née Kyle). His first job was an office boy for a newspaper, later going on to work at Belfast News for ten years. In September 1874, he immigrated to the United States, getting a job with The Journal of Commerce.

He became a manager for the National Police Gazette, being granted ownership in late 1876 due to unpaid hours. A pioneer in yellow journalism, he often printed friskily-dressed women on the front page of the paper to attract buyers and published sensationalist stories. He helped increase the paper's circulation from 150,000 to 400,000 a week.

Fox famously feuded with John L. Sullivan, which stemmed from a dispute at Harry Hill's saloon. Fox attempted to create a match between Sullivan and Paddy Ryan, but backed from the deal due to being unauthorized to create a boxing match. The feud culminated in the Sullivan vs. Ryan bare-knuckle match.

Fox died on November 15, 1922, aged 72, in The Bronx, from pneumonia. He is buried in Woodlawn Cemetery in The Bronx. Two boats, the Richard K. Fox and Fox, are named for him. In June 1997, he and Don King were inducted into the International Boxing Hall of Fame.
