= Richard Fox (chronicler) =

English chronicler

Richard Fox (fl. 1448) was a lay clerk at the abbey of St Albans, where he served as chamberlain to Abbott John Whethamstede. He is notable for compiling, amongst other texts, an expanded version of the Brut chronicle, which is especially important for including contemporary accounts of the Parliament of Bury and of the death of Humphrey, Duke of Gloucester.

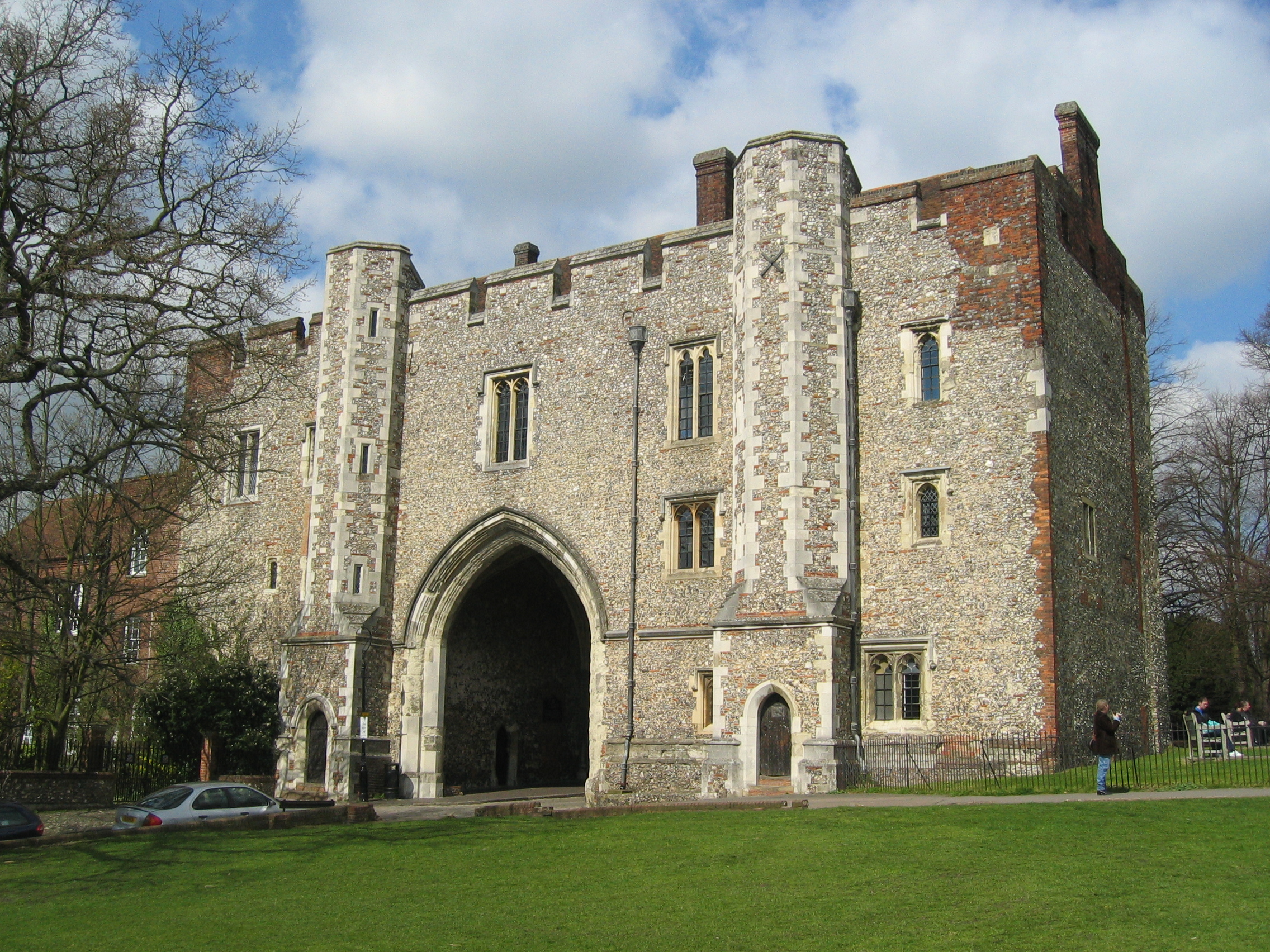
14th-century gateway to St Albans Abbey. Richard Fox, though a layman, served as a chamberlain and general administrator to Abbott Whethamstede.

Fox also claimed to have information regarding the identity of Peasants' Revolt leader Jack Straw from a person who was close to the events in 1381; Straw was identified as a John Tyler of Dartford, Kent, who sparked the revolt by killing a tax collector.

Little else is known about Fox, though his will of 1454 notes that he possessed several books including copies of the Confessio Amantis by John Gower and works by John Lydgate. Fox seems to have been an avid collector of books, though in this period it was still relatively rare to find a high degree of literacy outside the clergy. He also appears to have had a strong interest in the cult of Saint Alban.

Sections of the chronicle compiled by Fox, which is found in Woburn Abbey Ms. 181, were published in An English Chronicle of the Reigns of Richard II, Henry IV, Henry V, and Henry VI, edited by J. S. Davies (1856).
