= John J. Buro =

American sportswriter

John J. Buro (born in Brooklyn, New York) is a professional American sportswriter and also a published author, screenwriter, and lyricist. He has published four novels: Open Court: A Year With the New York Knicks (2010), Deliver Us From Evil (2006), Bite of the Shark (2002), and Profiles: Stories from the Sidelines. His first screenplay, Best Seats in the House, was written in 2004.

Buro is a graduate of John Jay High School (Brooklyn) and a past recipient of the George Goldstone Medal of Journalism.
