= National Police Gazette =

American tabloid-style magazine

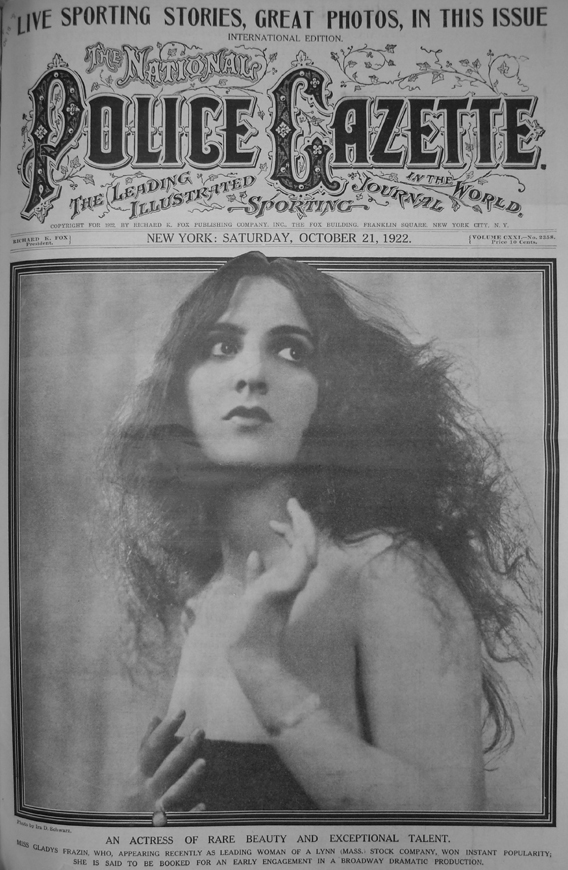
A 1922 cover page, showing Gladys Frazin

The National Police Gazette, commonly referred to as simply the Police Gazette, is an American magazine founded in 1845. Under publisher Richard Kyle Fox, it became the forerunner of the men's lifestyle magazine, the illustrated sports weekly, the girlie/pin-up magazine, the celebrity gossip column, Guinness World Records-style competitions, and modern tabloid/sensational journalism.

== Publication history ==
The magazine was founded by two journalists, Enoch E. Camp, an attorney, and George Wilkes, a transcontinental railroad booster. It began as a chronicler of crime and criminals, intended for consumption by the general public. In 1866, Wilkes and Camp sold the Gazette to George W. Matsell. (Note: Other sources state that Wilkes sold the Gazette shortly after his purchase of The Spirit of the Times in 1856, and that Matsell was the publisher of the Gazette through the American Civil War.) The editor and proprietor from 1877 until his death in 1922 was Richard Kyle Fox, an immigrant from Ireland.

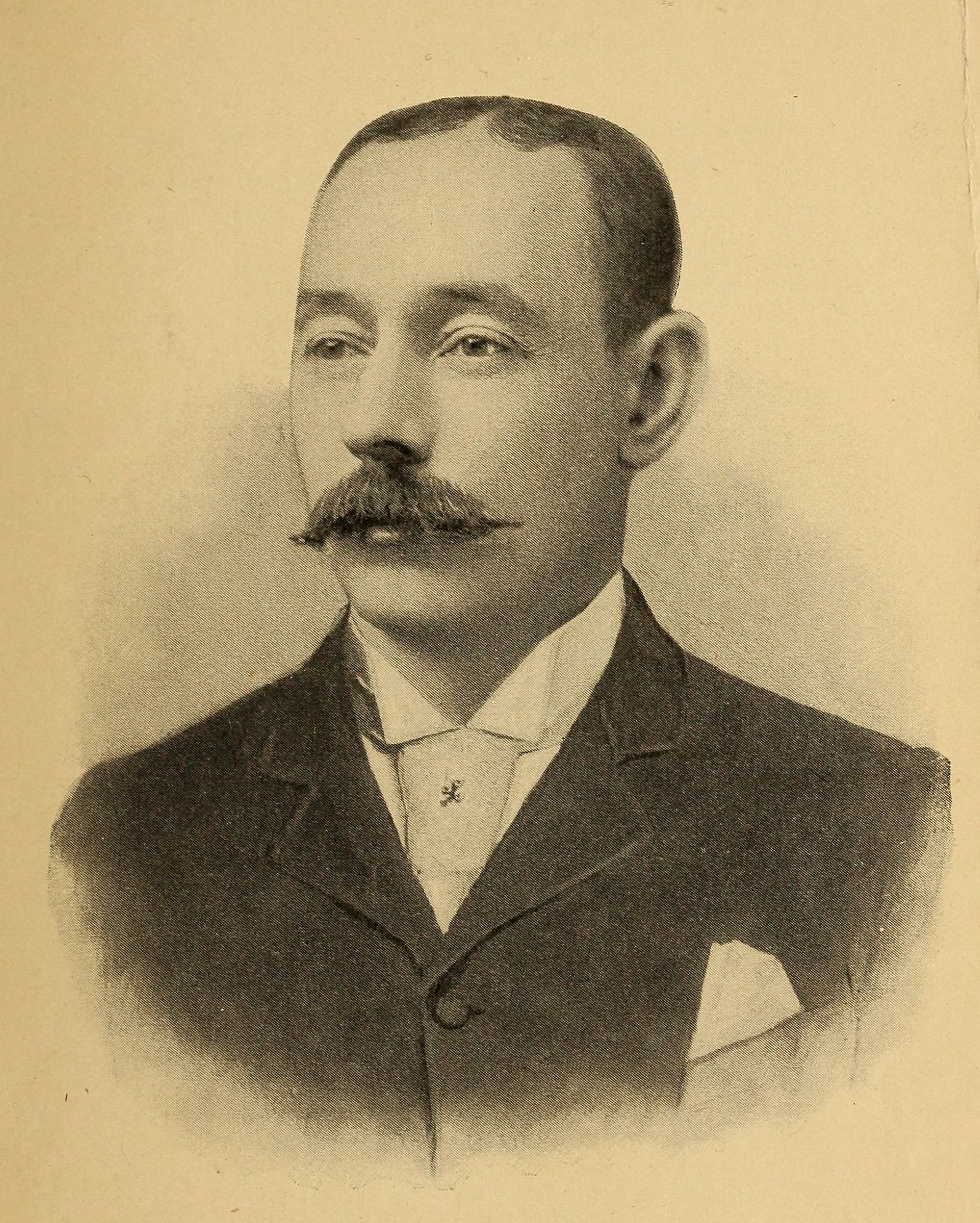
Richard Kyle Fox was editor and proprietor of the Gazette from 1877 to 1922

Ostensibly devoted to matters of interest to the police, it was a tabloid-like publication, with lurid coverage of murders, Wild West outlaws, and sport. It was well known for its engravings and photographs of scantily clad strippers, burlesque dancers, and prostitutes, often skirting on the edge of what was legally considered obscenity. For decades it was a staple furnishing of barber shops, where men would peruse it awaiting their turn. The publication's association with barber shops was noted in a Vaudeville routine in which the straight man asked "Seen the Police Gazette?," and his partner replied "No, I shave myself."

The National Police Gazette enjoyed considerable popularity in the late 19th century and early decades of the 20th century. Its popularity decreased during the Great Depression. In 1932, the Police Gazette ceased publication, and was sold at auction for a nominal sum. Publication was suspended from Feb. 11, 1932 until Sept. 5, 1933, when it was revived under the ownership of the Donenfelds, who placed it in the editorial hands of Mrs. Merle W. Hersey, the ex-wife of Harold Hersey. During this period the paper appeared twice a month and took on more of the flavor of a girlie magazine. The Donenfeld/Hersey regime did not last long. The magazine changed hands again within a year, coming into the possession of Harold H. Roswell and becoming a monthly publication in 1935. The National Police Gazette continued as a monthly publication in Roswell's hands for many years. The Canadian newspaper publisher Joseph Azaria took it over in 1968, and it finally ceased print publication in 1977.

In September 1942, the United States Post Office barred delivery of the publication through the mail because of its "obscene and lewd pictures."

In its heyday it was immensely influential. In the first part of the 20th century, the US became the center for professional boxing. It was generally accepted that the "world champions" were those listed by the Police Gazette. Fox handed diamond-studded belts to champion prizefighters. After 1920, the National Boxing Association began to sanction "title fights".

== Annual publication ==
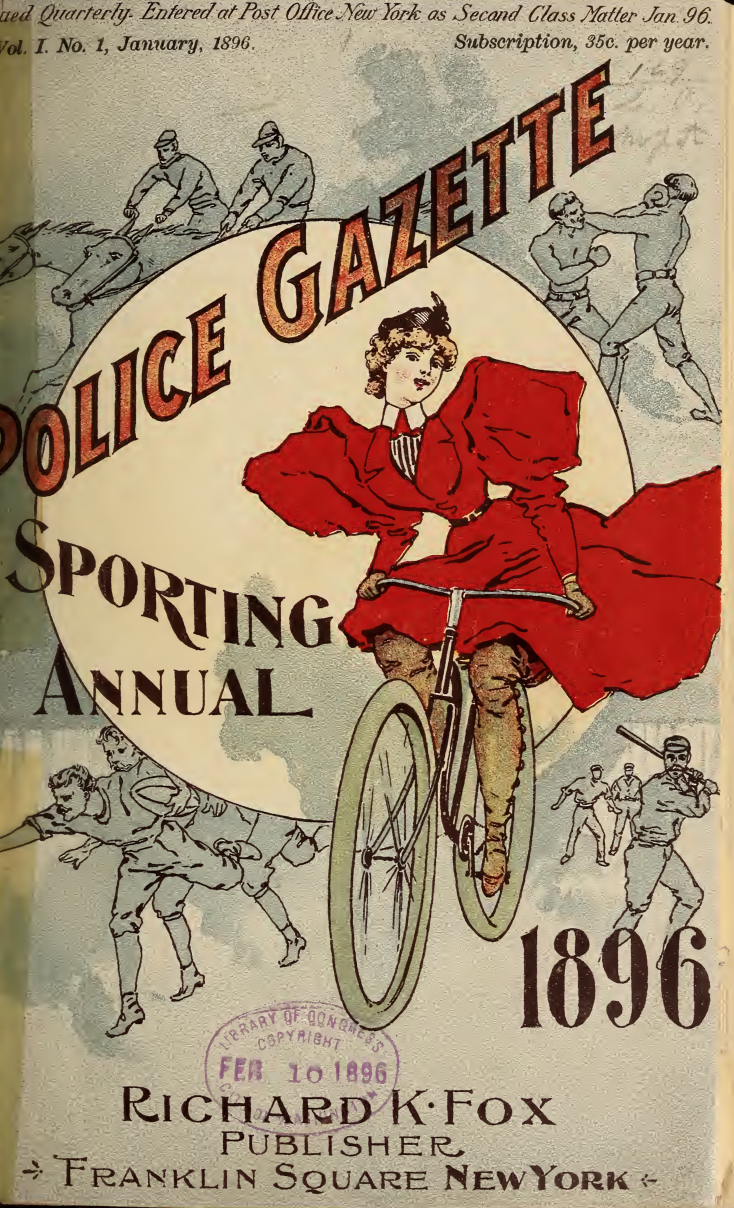
Cover of Sporting Annual from 1896

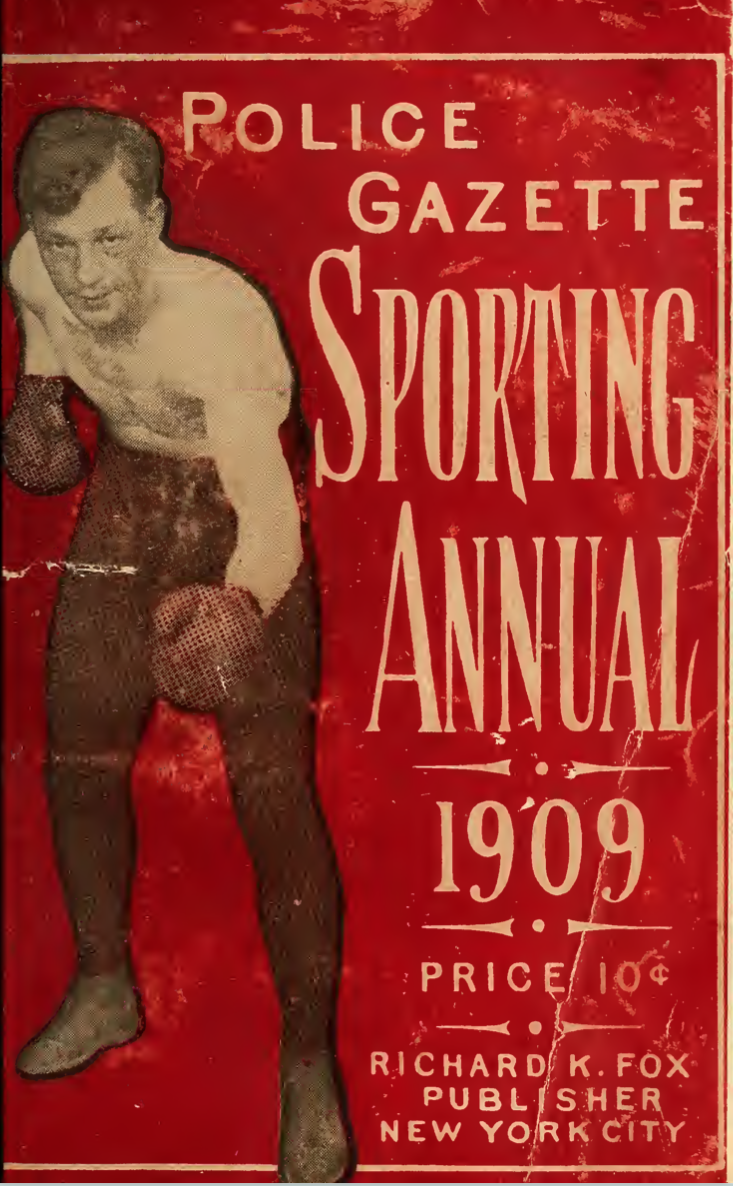
Cover of Sporting Annual from 1909

From 1896 to 1918, a Sporting Annual was published as a yearly summary of statistics in the sporting world. The guide touted themselves as "Statistics and Best Performances in Pugilism, Athletics, Bicycling, Rowing, Baseball, Trotting, and Racing." The 200+ page publication was compiled by Sam C. Austin, editor of the Gazette. Although primarily focused on boxing, there are dozens of unique illustrations and summaries on other sports that are of particular interest to those studying the history of sports.

== Frank Samuelsen and George Harbo ==
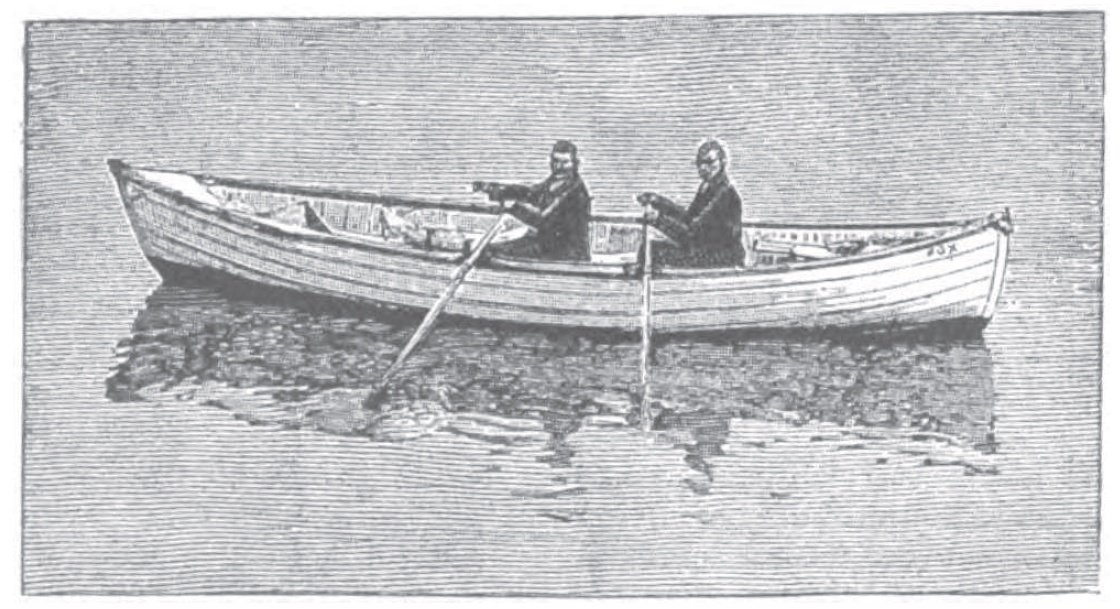
Record-setting Fox surf boat.

In 1896, the Police Gazette allegedly offered a prize of $10,000 (about $300,000 in 2018 money) to the first to row across the Atlantic Ocean, though no contemporary source exists confirming a Police Gazette offer of any significant monetary prize. In the same year, George Harbo and Frank Samuelsen invested their savings in an 18-foot rowboat, which they named 'Fox' after the editor of the Gazette, Richard K. Fox. Despite crossing the Atlantic in 55 days (a record not broken until 2010, albeit by a team of four rowers) the Police Gazette never paid the men the promised prize money, though no contemporary sources exist showing the money was ever offered by the Police Gazette or that the men were expecting a substantial sum from the Gazette. Numerous sources report the men were expecting either no money or only whatever money could be raised from exhibitions following successful completion of the voyage. Sources also show Richard K. Fox and the Police Gazette offered and provided towing of the 'Fox' to Bay Ridge, Brooklyn—the last outside propulsion used by Harbo and Samuelsen until reaching Europe; payment of expenses incurred by the American consulate in Le Havre for their food, clothing, and temporary shelter upon reaching the continent; two gold medals commemorating the achievement; and publicity within the pages of the Police Gazette. The Gazette was also the only newspaper willing to attach its name to the endeavor as others considered it too risky.

== Entertainment coverage of the vaudeville stage ==
On July 27, 1901 appeared as one of National Police Gazette headlines for reviews of popular entertainers, "Paragraphs of Interest Concerning the Stage Lives and Doings of Vaudeville People, Here can be Found Many Items Which Will Interest Performers as Well as Theater Goers, Professionals Requested to Send in Photos." On the list of favorably reviewed entertainers that included ventriloquists, minstrels, songsters, aerialists, and comedians was listed Pat H. Chappelle and his The Rabbit's Foot Company among other vaudeville shows.

== Hitler conspiracy theories ==
The Gazette claimed in 1939 that Adolf Hitler was homosexual and questioned in 1946 and 1947 whether he had really died in his Berlin bunker in 1945. Between 1951 and 1972, the Gazette published scores of stories asserting that Hitler could have somehow survived (often featuring him on the cover), contradicting the widely accepted account of his death. Writing for the Gazette, US intelligence officer William F. Heimlich asserted that Hitler's body would not have burned to ashes in the open air of the Reich Chancellery garden and that according to US tests the blood found on Hitler's sofa did not match his blood type. Other narratives range from the details of Hitler's alleged escape (with destinations including Antarctica and South America) to his supposed prime physical health and conceiving two children with Eva Braun around the late 1930s. In 2017, the Gazette published a new article reviving the narrative and calling on the Russian government to allow Hitler's dental remains to be DNA-tested to settle the matter.

== Current incarnation ==
Since 2007, the National Police Gazette has been managed by National Police Gazette Enterprises, LLC, which houses the official Police Gazette magazine archive, publishes new content online, puts out compilations of classic content from the past, provides a research service, and manages Police Gazette trademarks and copyrights.

=== Bare-knuckle boxing ===
The Police Gazette was the first organized boxing sanctioning body in the US, declaring its intention in 1881 and issuing championships beginning in 1882. Integral to the Police Gazette Rules was the requirement that championships be contested bare knuckle. Though all professional championship boxing was technically illegal, the Gazette continued as the bare-knuckle sanctioning organization until 1894 when it was clear gloved boxing would be the only acceptable mainstream version of the sport.

In March 2018, Wyoming became the first jurisdiction to legalize bare-knuckle fighting at the state level, and formal bare knuckle events have been happening since June 2018. In response, National Police Gazette Enterprises, LLC, in partnership with the Bare Knuckle Boxing Hall of Fame of Belfast, NY, created the Police Gazette Boxing Corporation as the successor to the Police Gazette's original bare knuckle boxing sanctioning activities. Current Police Gazette Champions are the lineal bare knuckle champions going back to those in the 19th century, such as John L. Sullivan.
