= Possible monorchism of Adolf Hitler =

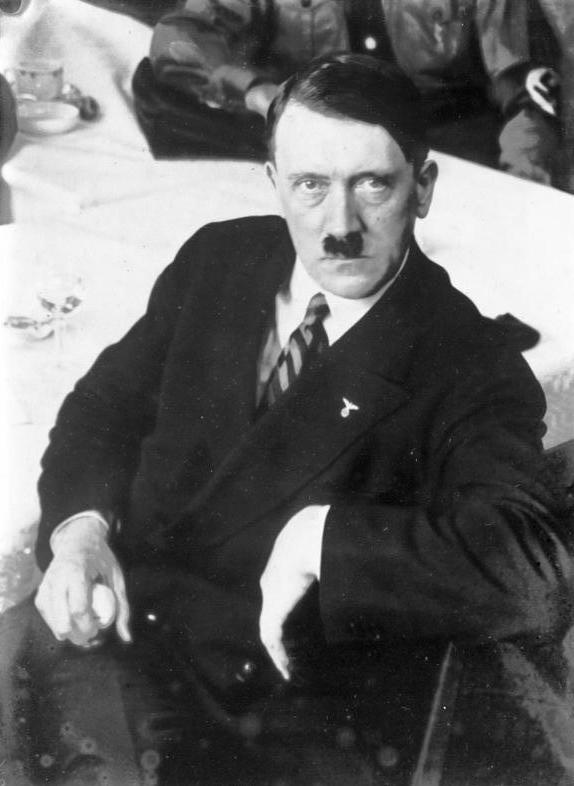
Adolf Hitler in 1932

Claims that Adolf Hitler had only one testicle (monorchism) have been scrutinized by historians. A 1923 medical report from Hitler's arrival to prison after his failed Beer Hall Putsch states that his right testicle was undescended – for which he may have had a predisposition, according to 2025 DNA analysis. Although Hitler often refused to fully undress for exams, his doctors denied that he was monorchid.

During World War II, a song maligning Hitler as monorchid was popularized. Subsequently, some secondhand accounts about Hitler's genitals were shared relating to his time as a soldier during the First World War. An alleged Soviet autopsy published in 1968 claims that Hitler's left testicle was missing, but the report is most likely disinformation; only Hitler's dental remains have been positively identified.

== Evidence ==
=== Nazi era ===
Documents from Landsberg Prison (where Hitler was held after his failed Beer Hall Putsch) were released by December 2015. A note in the Aufnahmebuch (book of arrivals at prison) by prison doctor Josef Brinsteiner, who reportedly examined Hitler in 1923, states that he had cryptorchidism (an undescended testicle) on the right side. An analysis of Hitler's DNA performed in 2025 suggested that he had the genetic markers for Kallmann syndrome, which hinders puberty and increases the chance of cryptorchidism. However, Hitler's ability to grow facial hair, as well as the relatively deep tone of his voice in the only known recording of him speaking regularly, implies that he entered puberty.

Although Hitler often refused to undress fully for exams, his doctor Erwin Giesing, personal physician Theodor Morell, and childhood doctor Eduard Bloch stated that Hitler's testicles were normal. During World War II, the British song "Hitler Has Only Got One Ball" maligned the dictator and other top Nazis as having substandard genitalia.

=== Related to World War I ===
In his 1957 book, Hitler's former friend Ernst Hanfstaengl claims that a story was often told that "Hitler's old army comrades, who had seen him in the wash-house ... noted that his genital organs were almost freakishly underdeveloped."

In the 1960s (although not published until 2008), Polish priest Franciszek Pawlar recorded the alleged account of former German Army medic Johan Jambor, who claimed that he helped bring Hitler to safety after he was injured by bomb shrapnel in October 1916 during the Battle of the Somme. Jambor purportedly stated: "His abdomen and legs were covered in blood. Hitler was wounded in the abdomen and had lost a testicle. His first question to the doctor was: 'Can I still father children?'" According to historian Ian Kershaw, the wound was to Hitler's left thigh.

=== Alleged Soviet autopsy ===
In 1968, Soviet journalist Lev Bezymenski published his book The Death of Adolf Hitler. Bezymenski describes a purported Soviet forensic examination and published the alleged autopsy led by Faust Shkaravsky. The book states that:

The autopsy performed by the Red Army pathologists on Hitler's body... [produced clear] findings: The left testicle could not be found either in the scrotum or on the spermatic cord inside the inguinal canal, or in the small pelvis ...

Although Hitler's 1923 prison examination (only released in 2015) states that his right – not left – testicle was undescended, the Soviet report prompted psychohistorian Robert G. L. Waite to write in 1977 that he found it likely that the dictator was monorchid, citing the identification of the dental remains. However, only Hitler's dental remains were positively identified, similar to those of Eva Braun – with any remainder of his and Braun's corpses subject to debate (helping fuel survival theories). (Note: Historian Hugh Trevor-Roper wrote in 1947 that the bones should have been found intact, as they would not have been destroyed by open-air burning (in line with certain scientific studies). Contrarily, in 1950, American jurist Michael Musmanno argued that the remains would have been reduced nearly to ashes, which was repeated in 1995 by historian Anton Joachimsthaler and later by others.) Meanwhile, the Soviet book's claims that Hitler died by cyanide poisoning or even a coup de grâce, contrary to eyewitness reports, have exposed it as propaganda, (Note: This was part of a line of disinformation starting with Joseph Stalin's 1945 claim that Hitler had escaped.) as Bezymenski admitted in 1992. In 1998, American journalist Ron Rosenbaum suggested that the missing testicle was a similar falsified detail to portray Hitler as a coward, which historian Sjoerd de Boer agreed with in 2022.

== See also ==
- Health of Adolf Hitler
