= Faust Shkaravsky =

Physician who conducted autopsy on Hitler's remains

Dr. Faust Iosifovich Shkaravsky (Russian: Фауст Иосифович Шкаравский; 1897–1975) was an officer and physician in the Soviet army during World War II. He was a forensic expert, most famous for overseeing an alleged autopsy of Adolf Hitler's charred remains in 1945.

== Biography ==
Shkaravsky was born into a Jewish family in 1897 in the Ukrainian village of Kukavka (Russian: Kukovka) in Podolia Governorate of the Russian Empire (5 kilometres or 3 miles west of Vendychany in Vinnytsia Oblast) to Iosif Shkaravsky. In 1925, he graduated from the Kiev State Medical Academy. Prior to World War II, he worked as a civilian forensic expert in Kiev and then in the Department of Forensic Medicine in the Kiev Institute of Advanced Training of Physicians, today the P.L. Shupyk National Medical Academy of Postgraduate Education, along with Yuri Sergeyevich Sapozhnikov and Agnes M. Hamburg.

Shkaravsky served in the Soviet Red Army starting from 25 May 1941. He worked as a forensic expert at various fronts of the war. He was awarded several medals during his service, including the Order of the Red Star and the Order of the Patriotic War.

== Autopsy of Adolf Hitler ==
At the end of World War II, Shkaravsky served as chief medical examiner of the Central Front. He headed a commission of Soviet experts that examined the remains of several individuals found around the Führerbunker in Berlin, including Joseph Goebbels and his family, and allegedly including Adolf Hitler and Eva Braun. This was detailed in the 1968 propaganda book The Death of Adolf Hitler. The autopsy, which claims that Hitler died by cyanide poisoning instead of a gunshot, is widely dismissed by modern scholars as Soviet disinformation. Soviet leader Joseph Stalin stated in 1945 that Hitler faked his death and fled to Spain or South America, with the Soviets alleging that only a body double had been found. Only the dental remains were confirmed to belong to Hitler. Described in the book, these were sundered at the alveolar process and allegedly found loose on the body.

In interviews for the 1970s documentary television series The World at War, Shkaravsky continued to claim that his team had examined Hitler's body, saying it tested positive for cyanide poisoning. Mainstream Western historians such as Anton Joachimsthaler, Ian Kershaw, and Luke Daly-Groves conclude that the alleged Soviet autopsy of Hitler's remains was fraudulent in nature, perhaps even describing another body, with the exception of the authentic dental remains. Daly-Groves opined in 2019 that Stalin's motivations for spreading disinformation remain unclear.

== After World War II ==
Shkaravsky used his expertise to help prosecute Nazi crimes connected to the Holocaust. He helped show the extent of crimes that took place in the Majdanek concentration camp.

After the war, he worked in Kiev as a medical examiner. He completed his Ph.D, Changes to the Lungs and Liver in Instances of Death by Drowning, in 1951. In 1962 he retired from military service. He died in 1975.
