= The Death of Adolf Hitler =

1968 book by Lev Bezymenski

The Death of Adolf Hitler: Unknown Documents from Soviet Archives
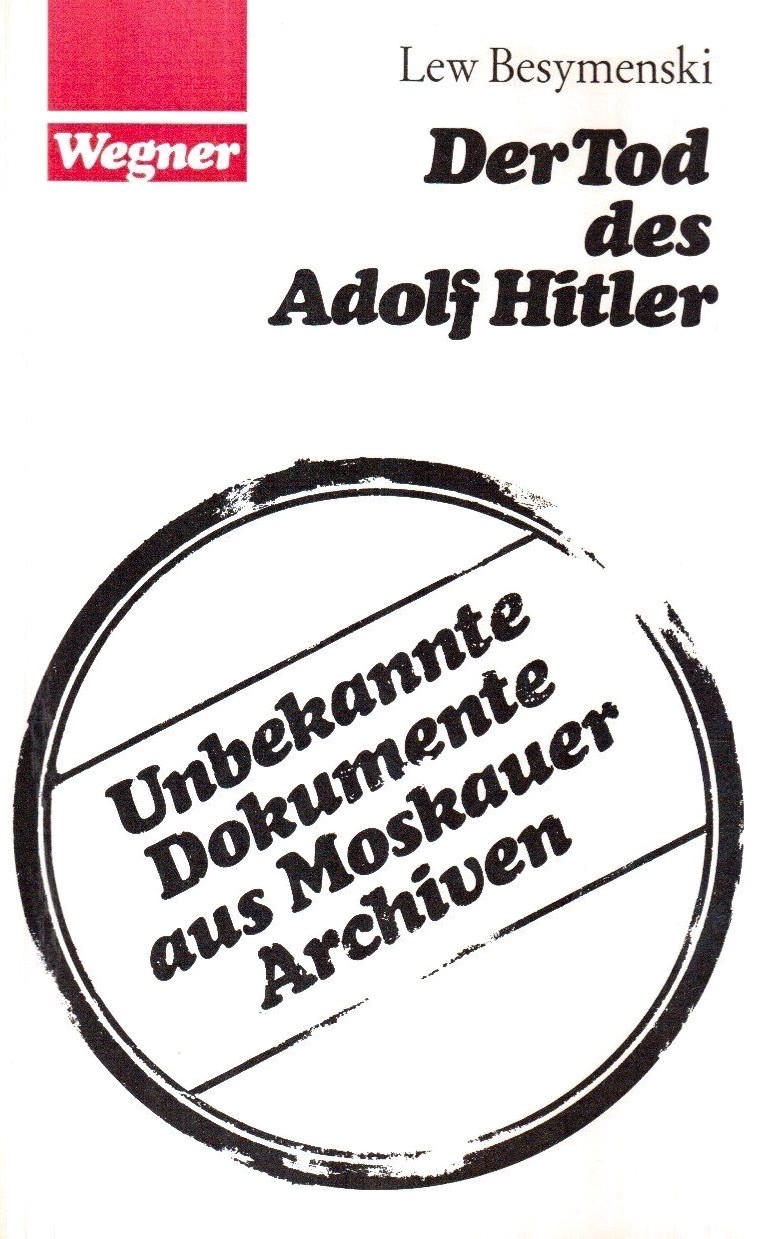
- Cover of the first edition
- Author: Lev Bezymenski
- Original title: Der Tod des Adolf Hitler: Unbekannte Dokumente aus Moskauer Archiven (Note: Initially released in German as Der Tod des Adolf Hitler: Unbekannte Dokumente aus Moskauer Archiven, the 1982 German second edition was re-subtitled Der sowjetische Beitrag über das Ende des Dritten Reiches und seines Diktators (lit. 'The Soviet Contribution to the End of the Third Reich and Its Dictator').)
- Language: German
- Publisher: Wegner
- Publication date: 1968
- Publication place: Germany
- English publication date: 1968
- Media type: Print (paperback)
- Pages: c. 134

The Death of Adolf Hitler: Unknown Documents from Soviet Archives is a 1968 book by Soviet journalist Lev Bezymenski, who served as an interpreter in the Battle of Berlin. The book gives details of the purported Soviet autopsies of Adolf Hitler, Eva Braun, Joseph and Magda Goebbels, their children, and General Hans Krebs. Each of these individuals are recorded as having died by cyanide poisoning, contrary to the conclusion of Western scholars that Hitler died by a suicide gunshot.

The book's release was preceded by many contrary reports about Hitler's death, including from self-contradictory (and some tortured) eyewitnesses. The Soviets implied that the body of an apparent double belonged to Hitler, that such a body was found with Hitler's dental remains (perhaps killed by cyanide), and that the dictator used these means to fake his death and escape Berlin. Some Western authors suggested that the lack of a body was due to its burning. (Note: In 2003, German forensic biologist Mark Benecke argued that body water would inhibit an open-air cremation. Oven cremation at 600–800 °C (1,112–1,472 °F) eradicates organic material and contracts bone, the latter wholly melting at 1,630 °C (2,970 °F). Burning does not typically disintegrate bones.) Much of the information presented in the book about Hitler's cause of death (e.g. poisoning or a coup de grâce) has been discredited, even by the author, as propaganda. The only Soviet forensic description accepted by Western sources is that of Hitler's dental remains, (Note: In addition to a maxillar golden bridge, Hitler's dental remains include a mandibular fragment broken around the alveolar process.) photographs of which were novelly published via the book.

== Background ==
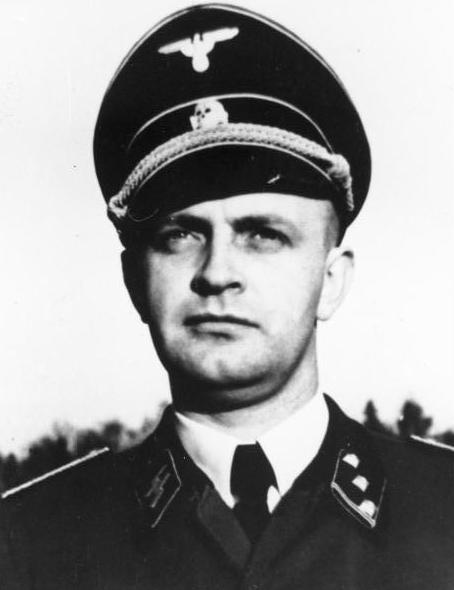
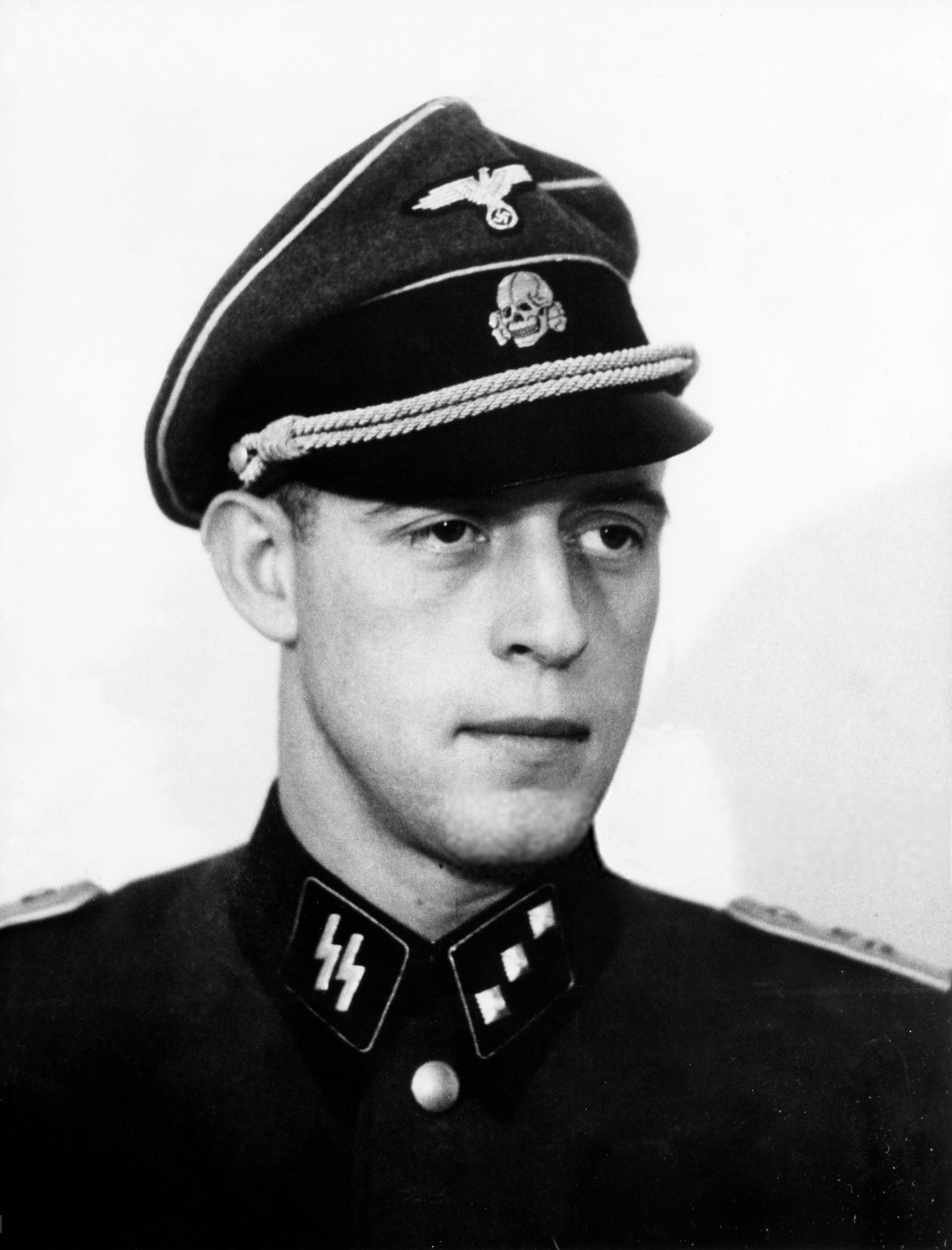
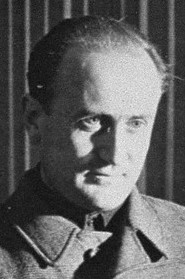
The key surviving witnesses to the immediate aftermath of Hitler's death: Heinz Linge, Otto Günsche, and Artur Axmann. The former two were interrogated by the Soviet Union and then the Western Allies; Axmann spoke only to U.S. officials (giving details of Hitler's death when photographed here).

On April 22, 1945, as the Red Army was closing in on the Führerbunker during the Battle of Berlin, Hitler declared that he would stay in Berlin and shoot himself. That same day, he asked Schutzstaffel (SS) physician Werner Haase about the most reliable method of suicide; Haase suggested combining a dose of cyanide with a gunshot to the head. SS physician Ludwig Stumpfegger provided Hitler with some ampoules of prussic acid (hydrogen cyanide), which the dictator initially planned to use but later doubted their efficacy. On 29 April, Hitler ordered Haase to test one of the ampoules on his dog Blondi; the dog died instantly. On the afternoon of 30 April, Hitler committed suicide with Eva Braun in his bunker study.

The former Reich minister of propaganda and Hitler's successor as chancellor of Germany, Joseph Goebbels, informed the Reichssender Hamburg radio station of Hitler's death. The news was first broadcast on the night of 1 May.

=== Initial Soviet surveys ===
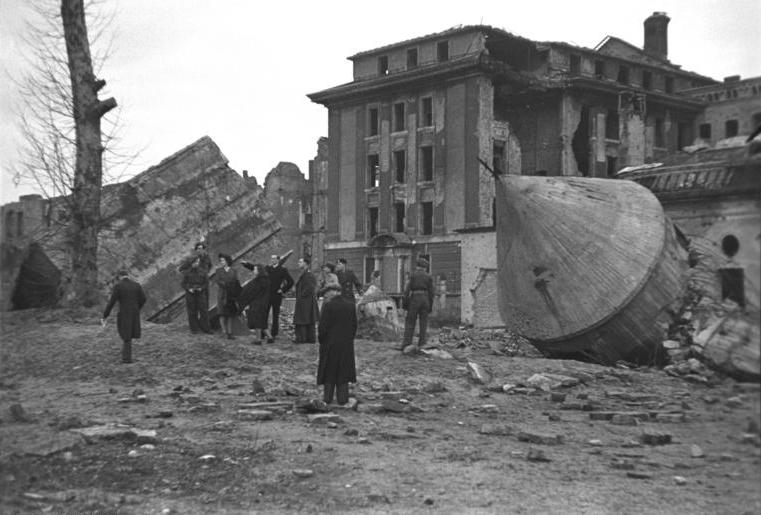
In 1947, the Soviets destroyed the emergency exit and guard towers of the Führerbunker.

On 2 May 1945, the official Soviet newspaper Pravda declared the report of Hitler's death to have been a Nazi trick. On 4 May, Soviet newspapers implied that his body was likely destroyed by fires in the Reich Chancellery bunker complex and a Soviet intelligence report of 8 May stated that Hitler's "bullet-riddled and battered" body had been found, with the identification supported by all but two questioned Nazi servants. On 10 May, Soviet dispatches to Moscow announced that they had found the bodies of Martin Bormann and Goebbels, as well as four bodies in the Führerbunker bearing "some resemblance to Hitler". By 11 May, two colleagues of Hitler's dentist, Hugo Blaschke, confirmed the dental remains of Hitler and Braun; (Note: Dental assistant Käthe Heusermann helped locate Hitler's X-rays and directed the Soviets to dental technician Fritz Echtmann, who had made Hitler's bridges. The Soviets implied the extracted dental remains were still attached to flesh and bone, while the dental witnesses denied that the bridges were attached to any complete bone.) (Note: Reportedly, "remnants of charred muscles" were preserved. In his 2018 analysis, French forensic pathologist Philippe Charlier pointed out muscle remnants near the burnt areas of the jawbone fragment (e.g. the depressor anguli oris and orbicularis oris).) both dental witnesses would remain in Soviet custody for about a decade. By 14 May, captured Nazi propaganda broadcaster Hans Fritzsche stated that Hitler had killed himself, but that his body had "been hidden in a place impossible to find". On 17 May, SS-Sturmbannführer Otto Günsche purportedly told the Soviets—contrary to his later testimony—that he only saw the couple's bodies after they had been wrapped in blankets. A Soviet report of 23 May cited chemical analysis and Nazi servants in determining that the body purportedly belonging to Hitler had died from poison injected by Stumpfegger on 1 May, with Günsche having hidden the corpse in a secret location.

On 6 June 1945, Western correspondents cited the statements of Soviet Marshal Georgy Zhukov's staff that Hitler's body was most likely one of four charred corpses found in the Führerbunker on 3 May or 4 May, burned by the Red Army's flamethrowers before they stormed in. According to forensic tests, this individual had died by cyanide poisoning. At a press conference on 9 June, Zhukov revealed that Hitler had married Braun and presented the official Soviet disinformation narrative that the dictator had escaped. The next day, newspapers quoted Zhukov as saying, "We have found no corpse that could be Hitler's," and Soviet Colonel General Nikolai Berzarin as stating, "Perhaps he is in Spain with Franco." In early July, Time magazine reported that the Soviet investigation had produced no conclusive evidence of Hitler's death and asserted that he had ordered his men to spread false news of his demise.

In early July 1945, British newspapers quoted a Soviet major who reputedly led the Red Army into the Chancellery garden as saying that he saw a body near the bunker exit which he thought was "a very poor double". United States newspapers quoted the Russian garrison commandant of Berlin as claiming that Hitler had "gone into hiding somewhere in Europe", possibly aided by Francoist Spain. When asked at the Potsdam Conference in mid-July how Hitler had died, Soviet leader Joseph Stalin said he was living "in Spain or Argentina". In mid-1945, a Soviet major told American sources that Hitler escaped, claiming that the body found in the Chancellery garden "didn't look like Hitler at all" and that Braun's body had also not been found.

According to SS valet Heinz Linge, who was captured by the Soviets in early May 1945, his interrogators repeatedly questioned him about whether Hitler was dead or if he could have escaped using a body double; the Soviets told him that they had found multiple corpses but were unsure about Hitler's remains. In 1955, Linge stated that his interrogation by the Soviets suggested they never found his body. In 1956, the German tabloid newspaper Das Bild quoted the captain of the Soviet People's Commissariat for Internal Affairs (NKVD) as claiming that both Hitler and Braun's bodies had been found and that "Hitler's skull was almost intact, as were the cranium and the upper and lower jaws," with the identification proven by the confirmation of the dental remains.

=== Eyewitness accounts ===
British MI6 intelligence officer Hugh Trevor-Roper argued that discrepancies amongst truthful eyewitnesses could be due to differences in "observation and recollection", (Note: One author argues that conflicts between witnesses increase their reliability (with full agreement implying a rehearsed story); according to a legal commenter, a judge would prefer a rational explanation for conflicts.) but certain witnesses also contradict themselves. German historian Anton Joachimsthaler theorized that the turbulent event resulted in poor memory formation for several individuals. The Soviets and East Germans employed interrogational torture, considered in the 21st century to be ineffective and result in false statements. Hitler's chauffeur, Erich Kempka, admitted in 1974 that "to save my own skin, I told [Western] interrogators just about anything ... I thought they wanted to hear."

The Soviets initially imprisoned Linge and Günsche separately so they could not conspire to make their statements match. Placed in a cell with an NKVD man disguised as a German soldier, Linge stated that he would not let his captors crack him. Also in custody, Hitler's pilot Hans Baur told Linge and Günsche to "Never say what really happened," remaining loyal to his Führer. Linge and Günsche shared a cell from mid-1948 to the end of 1949, when they shared details for a Soviet book about Hitler's last days. Both men were initially uncooperative, especially Günsche; Linge's apparent forthcomingness reportedly led Günsche to make threats against him "to bring Linge round to his point of view". In 2002, German historian Joachim Fest argued that increased discrepancies between eyewitness reports about late April 1945 had rendered Hitler's death "impossible to reconstruct", but the account of a suicide gunshot to the right temple seemed "closest to what probably happened". English historian Mark Felton suggested that this may have been done to conceal Nazi forensic fraud, specifically putting Hitler and Braun's dental remains into the mouths of decoy bodies.

==== Immediate aftermath ====
Three main eyewitnesses to the state of Hitler and Braun's bodies in the immediate aftermath of their deaths survived and provided their accounts: Linge, Günsche, and Hitler Youth leader Artur Axmann. Linge and Günsche were quickly captured by the Soviets and spent a decade in captivity, undergoing extensive questioning under torturous conditions; Axmann was arrested by the U.S. Army in December 1945. In a purported Soviet transcript of a statement made on 17 May 1945, Günsche said he only saw the bodies after they had been wrapped in blankets. In 1946, Linge told the Soviets that he saw a wound the size of a small coin on Hitler's right temple; he also stated that he saw traces of blood running down Hitler's cheek in two streams and (to the undercover NKVD man) that the wound seemed like it could have been painted on. Meanwhile, Günsche repeatedly told the Soviets that he only learned from Linge that Hitler died by gunshot. All three key eyewitnesses told Western authorities that they saw the bodies of Hitler (seated upright) and Braun (next to him with no visible wounds) before they were moved.

In 1956, West Germany created reconstructions of contrary eyewitness reports of how Hitler's body was found: either on a couch with Eva Braun (Linge/Axmann) or in an armchair (Günsche).

In June 1945, U.S. authorities captured Erich Kempka. He initially claimed that just after Hitler's death, Günsche provided no details about Hitler's death, but later said Günsche indicated that Hitler shot himself through the mouth (claiming Günsche made a hand gesture to indicate this, which Günsche later denied). Trevor-Roper cited this method of death in his November 1945 report. After his capture in December 1945, Axmann told U.S. officials that he saw thin ribbons of blood coming from both of Hitler's temples, but that a slightly askew lower jaw made him think Hitler had shot himself through the mouth, with the temple blood being a result of internal trauma. (Note: According to Junge, Günsche initially told her that Hitler died via a gunshot through the mouth. Axmann also thought this method was used. According to Linge and Günsche's later statements, Hitler killed himself via a gunshot to the temple. In 2017–2018, forensic analysis was conducted on Hitler's dental remains, which did not detect any gunpowder.) SS-Hauptsturmführer Karl Schneider said that when he helped move Hitler's body, he saw coagulated blood on both of his temples. Axmann did not check the back of the head for an exit wound. Additionally, Axmann said Günsche told him that Hitler had taken poison then shot himself, with Axmann saying Günsche could have been told by Hitler or his doctor; Günsche later denied telling Axmann that Hitler took poison. Trevor-Roper repeated the story of a shot through the mouth in his 1947 book, additionally citing statements by Bormann's secretary Else Krüger and Hitler's secretaries Traudl Junge (who was reputedly told by Günsche) and Gerda Christian (allegedly told by Linge). (Note: Additionally, this method of death was recorded by American historian William L. Shirer and British historian Alan Bullock.)

In 1948, the Berlin Records Office cited Kempka and Axmann's testimony from the Einsatzgruppen trial at Nuremberg that they had seen Hitler's body being carried in a blanket as insufficient evidence of the dictator's death; this led to an extensive investigation and new testimony. In 1956, Linge, Günsche, and Baur were released by the Soviets. Thereafter, Linge and Günsche were questioned by the western Allies as to Hitler's manner of death, which included court testimony. Both men stated that they saw a wound the size of a small coin on Hitler's right temple and a puddle of blood on the floor. Linge and Axmann stated, in accord with forensic evidence, that Hitler's body was sitting at one end of the sofa; Günsche said it was in an adjacent armchair. The discrepancies between eyewitnesses spurred a criminological report for West Germany officials, employing ballistics tests. Hitler's death certificate was registered in 1956 as an assumption of death on the incorrect basis that no eyewitnesses saw his body.

In 1956, SS-Standartenführer Wilhelm Mohnke stated that soon after Hitler's death, Günsche said Hitler had ordered Linge to deliver a coup de grâce-style gunshot to ensure his death after he took poison; Mohnke was unsure whether Günsche said Hitler had also given him this command or if it had actually been carried out. Günsche denied making such statements. Both SS-Rottenführer Harry Mengershausen and Reichssicherheitsdienst (RSD) guard Hermann Karnau initially asserted that Stumpfegger killed Hitler via a poison injection, but Mengershausen later claimed to have seen the entry wound to the right temple and Karnau said that before the cremation began the skull was "partially caved in and the face encrusted with blood". Günsche said that by this time "the bloodstains from the temple had spread further over the face". Linge stated in 1965 that the entry wound was to the left temple, but recanted this.

SS-Oberscharführer Rochus Misch told U.S. interviewers over 50 years after the fact that he quickly looked in the study and saw Hitler's head facedown on the table, contradicting himself about whether he saw blood; he uniquely claimed that Braun's head was leaning against Hitler's leg. He later wrote in his autobiography that Braun's head was only "inclined towards Hitler" and that he could not remember if the dictator was sitting on the sofa or the armchair, nor any blood. Further, Hitler's head had only "fallen forward slightly", his eyes "open and staring".

==== Corpse disposal ====
Kempka claimed to recognize Hitler's body as it was being moved, primarily by his legs as the torso was covered in a blanket. On cross-examination, Kempka proclaimed that he had mended some of Hitler's socks the night before his wedding to Braun, suppositionally reconciling Hitler's corpse with that of the body double. Some witnesses noticed that Hitler's body was wearing his customary silk socks, while Linge said they were paper. Kempka contradicted himself about whether he saw blood on the rug, possibly because it was "multi-colored". In 1953, Kempka said he recalled seeing a puddle of blood in front of the sofa about 20–25 cm (8–10 in) in diameter. In 1956, Linge said he saw a puddle "next to the sofa" and Günsche said one was "to the right of the armchair". Kempka stated about the cremations, "I doubt if anything remained of the bodies. The fire was terrifically intense. Maybe some evidence like bits of bone and teeth could be found but [the artillery shelling] scattered things all over." (Note: Both Axmann and Mengershausen asserted that the gunshot must have disrupted Hitler's dental remains, the latter asserting that the resultant air pressure would have broken the jawbones.) According to Kempka and other eyewitnesses, there was enough petrol (perhaps over 150 liters or 40 U.S. gallons) to achieve extensive burning of the couple's bodies; by comparison, the bodies presumed to be those of Joseph and Magda Goebbels were reputedly burnt with less than 80 L (21 U.S. gal), causing only heavy charring. Mengershausen reported seeing under 40 L used to burn Hitler and Braun.

Karnau made numerous contradictory statements about the burnings, including that the lower portions burned away first and that eventually (but at an earlier stated time) they were reduced to skeletons, or rather ashes. (Note: In 1951, Karnau stated that at 18:00 he saw the "distinctive skeleton" of both Hitler and Braun and that at 20:00 he returned and saw "the flakes ... blowing in the wind". In 1953, he recalled that around 17:00 he tried to move the "skeletons", which crumbled upon being touched by his foot. In 1954, he recanted the term "skeletons" and said it was "a pile of ashes [that] disintegrated when touched" and that he did not return (as stated in 1951).) RSD guard Erich Mansfeld testified in 1954 that around 18:00 he and Karnau saw Hitler and Braun's still-burning "charred and shrunken corpses". In 1945, Kempka claimed he had no knowledge of the burnt remains being moved, but in 1953 said he and SS-General Johann Rattenhuber visited the site around 19:30 and saw ashes, with Rattenhuber telling him these would be buried; in 1955 Rattenhuber denied this. Mengershausen claimed in 1945 that he saw two of Hitler's personal guards move the burnt corpses into a bomb crater and level it with soil. In 1956, Mengershausen stated that it was he and SS-Unterscharführer Glanzer who moved the remains (Hitler's corpse largely intact except for the feet), putting them on boards and burying them in a 2-meter (6 1/2-foot)-deep crater under 1 m of soil, over about 90 minutes. Hitler dental technician Fritz Echtmann asserted that Mengershausen acted on Rattenhuber's orders, despite the latter's denial. Linge, who in 1955 implied that the corpse burned only briefly, stated that Günsche "ordered an SS officer called Hans Reisser to take some men of the Leibstandarte and bury the remains". Günsche testified in 1956 that SS-Hauptsturmführer Ewald Lindloff and Reisser were ordered to complete the task.

=== Further findings ===
In 1945, separate investigations by the Western allies noted a bloodstain on Hitler's bed frame suggesting that blood had trickled there from the mattress, which was missing. (Note: Some damaged mattresses were found in the nearby map room, where some furniture was burned, but no blood was noticed. A British officer surmised that Hitler could have been maimed in bed, with a less bloody death than a point-blank gunshot occurring on the sofa.) In July 1945, Life photojournalist William Vandivert photographed American correspondent Percy Knauth troweling dirt in the crater Hitler and Braun were presumedly buried in (in agreement with Mengershausen and Mansfeld).

Largely owing to Western interviews with eyewitnesses establishing that Hitler had died by gunshot, the NKVD and its successor, the Ministry of Internal Affairs, conducted a second investigation (known as "Operation Myth") from 1945 to 1946. The Soviets concluded that the poison capsules found in the mouths of the corpses wrongly identified as Hitler and Braun had been placed posthumously as part of a deliberate deception, evidently conducted by the Germans. Blood from Hitler's sofa and wall was reportedly matched to his blood type and a partially burnt skull fragment was found with gun damage near the bottom of the right parietal bone. (Note: In 2003, forensic anthropologist Marilyn London argued that internal trauma caused by the gunshot could have facilitated the detachment of the skull fragment. In 2009, DNA and forensic tests indicated that it belonged to a woman less than 40 years old.) Citing these two lines of evidence, the Soviets newly concluded that Hitler died by gunshot. Throughout the investigations, in various efforts to please Stalin, different Soviet departments withheld information from each other, the western Allies, and—at least temporarily—Stalin himself.

U.S. intelligence officer William F. Heimlich, in the introduction to the 1947 American fringe book Who Killed Hitler?, (Note: In 2019, historian Luke Daly-Groves noted in a review of declassified American intelligence files that some information about investigations of Hitler's death was kept from Heimlich "because higher-ranking American intelligence officers were aware that he was attempting to capitalise on sensational rumours". Daly-Groves contends that Heimlich's statements in the 1947 book proved the suspicions of higher-ranking U.S. Army officers to be correct, and that Heimlich's arguments demonstrate that he was not fully informed. In 2020, historian Richard J. Evans stated that Heimlich resented "being side-lined in favour of Trevor-Roper's investigation [and was] ill informed" and also that the story about Hitler being murdered on Himmler's orders "has never been taken seriously".) says the crater Hitler and Braun were reputedly buried in had not been excavated prior to his team's one-day investigation in December 1945, and that both Karnau and Mansfeld were unreliable, lacking knowledge of the bunker layout. The 1947 book suggests that Reichsführer-SS Heinrich Himmler arranged for Hitler's murder by poison (injected by Stumpfegger), with Günsche delivering a coup de grâce-style gunshot to the corpse hours later (Günsche also shooting the hesitant Braun), a narrative which has been dismissed by historians. The 1947 book asserts that Stalin "[kept] the ghost of Hitler alive" to galvanize his "totalitarian" communist forces. In the early 1950s, Heimlich told the National Police Gazette (an American tabloid-style magazine) that during their day of access to the bunker grounds, the Americans sifted the garden dirt and found no trace of burnt bodies. British writers Trevor-Roper and Alan Bullock argued that Hitler's body would not have completely burned to ashes in the open air, while Trevor-Roper considered that somebody could have boxed up and taken the ashen remains, as Günsche supposedly suggested.

An alleged Hitler body double with gunshot damage to the forehead filmed by the Soviets in 1945

In 1963, author Cornelius Ryan interviewed General B. S. Telpuchovski, a Soviet historian who was purportedly present during the aftermath of the Battle of Berlin. Telpuchovski claimed that on 2 May 1945 (the day Goebbels body was reputedly discovered), a burnt body he thought belonged to Hitler was found wrapped in a blanket. By 1964, Marshal Vasily Chuikov similarly asserted that on 2 May, the Soviets found "a still-smoking rug" containing the "scorched body of Hitler". According to Telpuchovski, the individual had been killed by a (seemingly self-inflicted) gunshot through the mouth, with an exit wound through the back of the head, and several dental bridges were found "lying alongside the head" because "the force of the bullet had dislodged them from the mouth". In his 1966 book, The Last Battle, Ryan describes this body as being Hitler's, saying it had been buried "under a thin layer of earth". Two other badly burnt Hitler candidates were allegedly produced, including an apparent body double with the remains of mended socks; Telpuchovski also cited an unburnt body. (Note: Soviets also told Cornelius Ryan in 1963 that Hitler's body had by that time been cremated.) Ryan was also told that Braun's body was never found and "that it must have been consumed completely by fire, and that any normally identifiable portions must have been destroyed or scattered in the furious bombardment".

Prior to Bezymenski's book, Hitler's entire mandible was implied to have been found by authors such as U.S. jurist Michael Musmanno (presiding judge at the Einsatzgruppen trial), Trevor-Roper, and Ryan. This is in basic agreement with Blaschke's assistant Käthe Heusermann, who stated in 1956 that she was shown a "complete lower jawbone", though it fit into a cigar box.

== Author ==
Soviet journalist Lev Bezymenski (1920–2007), the son of poet Aleksandr Bezymensky, served as an interpreter in the Battle of Berlin under Marshal Zhukov. Early on 1 May 1945, he translated a letter from Goebbels and Bormann announcing Hitler's death. Bezymenski authored several works about the Nazi era.

== Content ==
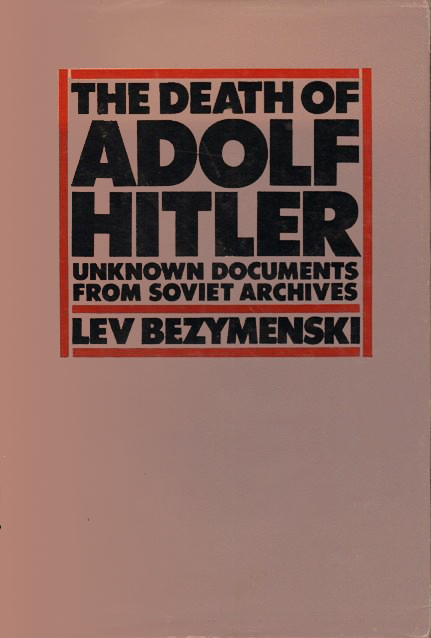
English hardcover edition (1968)

The book begins with an overview of the Battle of Berlin and its aftermath, including a reproduction of the purported Soviet autopsy report of Hitler's body. Bezymenski states that the bodies of Hitler and Braun were "the most seriously disfigured of all thirteen corpses" examined. The appendix summarizes the discovery of the Goebbels family's corpses and includes further forensic reports. On why the autopsy reports were not released earlier, Bezymenski says:

Not because of doubts as to the credibility of the experts. ... Those who were involved in the investigation remember that other considerations played a far larger role. First, it was resolved not to publish the results of the forensic-medical report but to "hold it in reserve" in case someone might try to slip into the role of "the Führer saved by a miracle." Secondly, it was resolved to continue the investigations in order to exclude any possibility of error or deliberate deception.

=== The Death of Adolf Hitler ===
Early in the book, Bezymenski contends that accounts written by those who lacked access to the autopsy reports "have confused the issue rather than clarifying it". He cites The Rise and Fall of the Third Reich (1960), in which American journalist William L. Shirer states:

The bones were never found, and this gave rise to rumors after the war that Hitler had survived. But the separate interrogation of several eyewitnesses by British and American intelligence officers leaves no doubt about the matter. Kempka has given a plausible explanation as to why the charred remains were never found. "The traces were wiped out," he told his interrogators, "by the uninterrupted Russian artillery fire."

Bezymenski goes on to cite Hitler: A Study in Tyranny (1962 edition), in which Alan Bullock says:

What happened to the ashes of the two burned bodies left in the Chancellery Garden has never been discovered. ... Trevor-Roper, who carried out a thorough investigation in 1945 of the circumstances surrounding Hitler's death, inclines to the view that the ashes were collected into a box and handed to Artur Axmann. ... It is, of course, true that no final incontrovertible evidence in the form of Hitler's dead body has been produced.

Box purportedly containing Hitler's burnt body

Bezymenski then gives an account of the battle of Berlin, the subsequent investigation by SMERSH, supplemented by later statements of Nazi officers. Bezymenski quotes SMERSH commander Ivan Klimenko's account, which states that on the night of 3 May 1945, he witnessed Vizeadmiral Hans-Erich Voss seem to recognize a body as Hitler's in a dry water tank filled with other corpses outside the Führerbunker, before recanting this identification. Klimenko noted that the corpse had mended socks, initially giving him doubt, as well. Klimenko then relates that on 4 May, he showed a group of soldiers where Joseph Goebbels's body was found, near the bunker emergency exit. Soviet Private Ivan Churakov climbed into a crater containing burnt pieces of paper and a bazooka, where he found legs sticking out of the ground. Two corpses were exhumed, but Klimenko had these wrapped in blankets and reburied, thinking that the corpse from the water tank was Hitler's. Only that day did several witnesses say it was definitely not Hitler's body and a diplomat released it for burial. On the morning of 5 May, Klimenko had the two bodies from the crater reexhumed.

As shown in the book, Hitler's dental remains consist of (left two images) a metallic maxillar bridge and (right) a mandibular fragment sundered near the alveolar ridge. (Note: The fragment is consistent with a region removable via mandibulectomy. The alveolar ridge rests within the gums, eliminating identifiable face scars.)

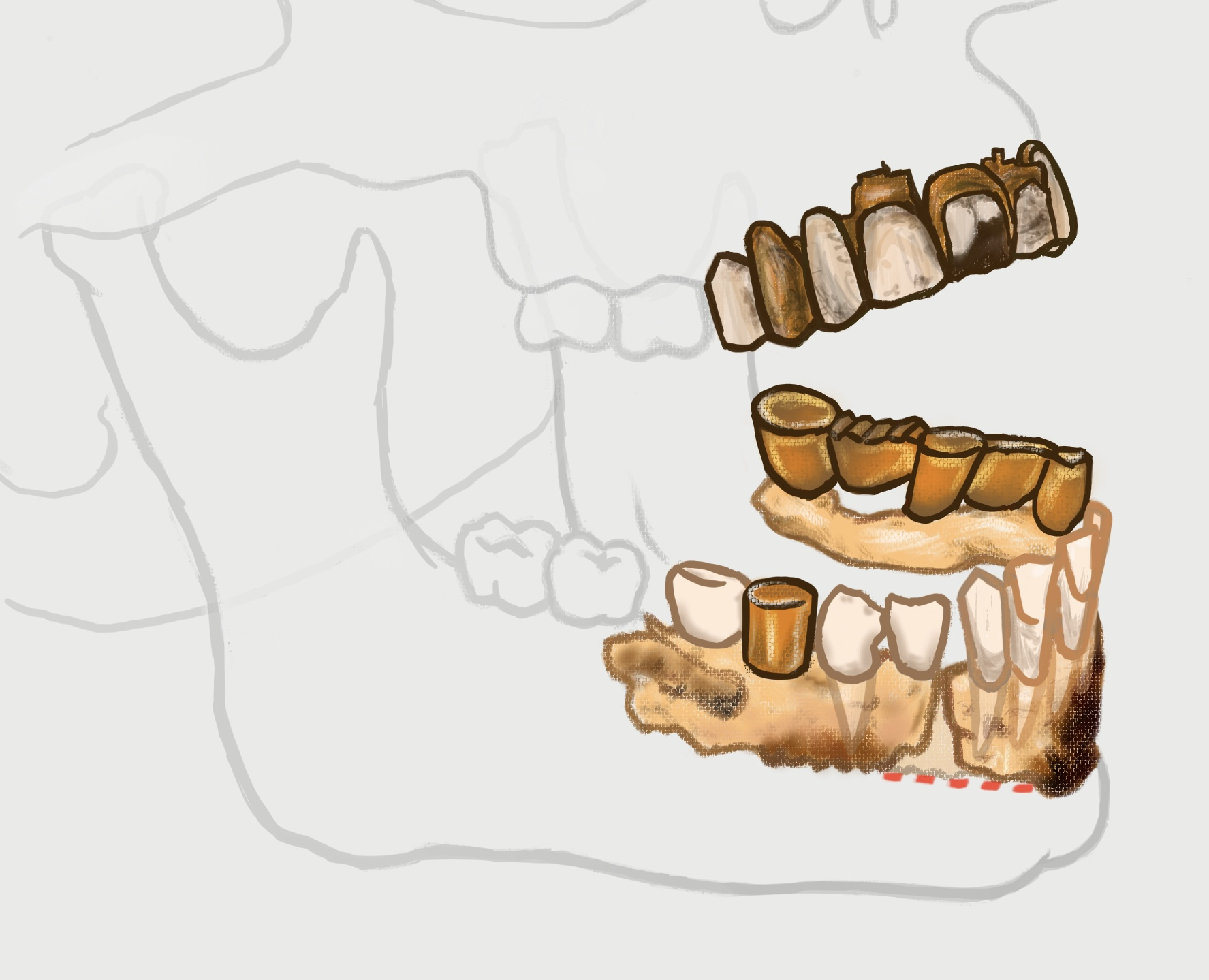
Hitler's dental remains are all that were confirmed to belong to his body. The mandibular fragment (dashed line) later degraded into three segments.

On 8 May, the Soviet forensicists reportedly received a wooden box containing the "remains of a male corpse disfigured by fire", ostensibly presumed to be Hitler's. The alleged body was estimated to be about 1.65 m (5 ft 5 in) tall, about the length of the box it was delivered in. (Hitler stood 1.75 m or 5 ft 9 in tall.) The report states that "the skin is completely missing" but some traces of muscles remained, including of the neck. Part of the skull was absent and the fire-damaged brain could be seen in part, with an intact dura mater. (Note: In the 1970s, ranking Soviet forensicist Faust Shkaravsky claimed that there was no damage to Hitler's brain (as in from a bullet).) The thorax, abdomen, and arms were partially intact, while the leg bones were somewhat crumbled due to burning. The left foot (Note: Karnau claimed that "the flesh on the lower parts of [Hitler's body] had burned away, and [his] shinbones were visible." Additionally, Mengershausen, who claimed to have reidentified Hitler's remains in July 1945, stated that "The feet had been entirely consumed.") and the left testicle were reportedly missing. (Note: Bezymenski says that "This congenital defect [of a missing testicle] had not been mentioned anywhere in the existing literature. But Professor Karl von Hasselbach, one of Hitler's physicians, remembers that the Führer always refused categorically to have a medical check-up." In 2015, Landsberg Prison documents from 1923 were released, stating that Hitler had an undescended testicle on the right side.) Additionally, "a piece of yellow jersey" was found, "charred around the edges, resembling a knitted undervest".

Blaschke's assistant Käthe Heusermann identified Hitler's dental remains on 9 May, followed by her description and technician Fritz Echtmann's identification on 11 May. Heusermann's analysis and its significance were retroactively added to the report as it was being converted from handwriting to type, despite being dated 8 May. The upper dental remains consisted of a bridge of nine primarily gold teeth. (Note: According to Bezymenski, Käthe Heusermann (assistant to Hitler's dentist, Hugo Blaschke) noticed where the maxillary bridge had been sawn through (behind the second premolar) by Blaschke in 1944.) The lower jawbone fragment had 15 teeth, 10 of them largely or entirely artificial; (Note: Charlier et al. 2018 describes a number of upper and lower teeth as conglomerates of natural and artificial elements. Only the four lower incisors and the lower right first premolar were not largely bridgework.) it was found loose in the oral cavity, broken and burnt around the alveolar process, the bulge that encases the tooth sockets. (Note: Despite the mandible fragment being unattached to flesh, the tip of the burnt tongue is claimed to have been "locked between the teeth of the upper and lower jaws." Bezymenski says the alveolar processes of the "jawbone" they found were "broken in the back".) (Note: The dental remains were subsequently stored at the KGB's headquarters. By 2017, the jawbone fragment had separated into three pieces and Philippe Charlier confirmed the Soviet description.) Splinters of glass and a "thin-walled ampule" were claimed (in an appendum) to have been found in the mouth, apparently from a cyanide capsule, which was allegedly corroborated by a chemical test of internal organs and thus ruled to be the cause of death. Ranking Soviet forensicist Faust Shkaravsky declared that "No matter what is asserted ... our Commission could not detect any traces of a gun shot ... Hitler poisoned himself."

A report by Klimenko records that on 13 May, Mengershausen stated that he watched Hitler and Braun's bodies burn for half an hour as well as their burial in the crater Hitler's dog Blondi was buried in, reportedly from a distance of 600 m (2,000 ft), ten times the actual distance (and contrary to his later account of helping bury the remains). Mengershausen specified the crater, which Klimenko says was where Churakov found the remains of the couple and two dogs on an unspecified date in May.

Bezymenski criticizes Nazi Germany's initial announcement of Hitler's death as an example of the dictator's 'big lie' propaganda technique as it implied him to have died as a soldier fighting "to the last breath". Bezymenski also questions the discrepancies of prior reports. Günsche allegedly told the Soviets in 1950 that both Hitler and Braun were seated on the sofa, but in 1960, said both were on chairs. Bezymenski notes Kempka's contrary account of a gunshot through the mouth and points out that Linge's 1965 claim of Hitler's entry wound being to the left temple is unlikely as Hitler was right-handed and his left hand trembled significantly.

Bezymenski argues that a self-inflicted shot through the mouth would have been prevented by a crushed cyanide ampoule, claiming that the poison "acts instantly" and that Hitler's declining health (particularly his hand tremors) would have prevented him from firing the suicide shot. Additionally, he cites the dictator's reluctance to fall into enemy hands as supporting a coup de grâce. Bezymenski quotes SS-General Rattenhuber as telling the Soviets that before killing himself with cyanide, Hitler ordered Linge to return in ten minutes to deliver a coup de grâce-style gunshot to ensure his death. Rattenhuber reputedly thought that Linge completed this task while the Soviets believed it was done by Günsche. Bezymenski avers that if anyone shot Hitler, it was not himself; he cites the little black dog found nearby, which was given poison then shot. The author also refers to an occipital skull fragment recovered in 1946 with an exit wound, saying it most likely belonged to Hitler.

Bezymenski asserts that sometime after the forensic examinations, the corpses of Hitler and the others were completely burned and the ashes scattered.

=== Appendix ===
The appendix includes the purported Soviet forensic reports on the bodies of Braun, the Goebbels family, General Krebs, and two dogs.

==== Eva Braun ====
Box purportedly containing Braun's remains

The purported autopsy of the body presumed to be Braun's was conducted on 8 May 1945. The corpse is noted as being "impossible to describe the features of" due to its extensive charring. Almost the entire upper skull was missing. The occipital and temporal bones were fragmentary, as was the lower left of the face. The upper jaw contained four teeth (three molars, a loose canine, and a detached root), while the lower jaw had six teeth on the left; the others were missing—according to the report "probably because of burning". Some teeth were affected by caries. The alveolar process of the maxilla was also absent. A piece of gold (likely a filling) was found in the mouth cavity, and a gold bridge with two false molars was under the tongue. The woman was judged to be no more than middle-aged due to her teeth being only slightly worn; her height was approximately 1.5 m (4 ft 11 in). There was a splinter injury to the chest resulting in hemorrhage and hemothorax, injuries to one lung and the pericardium—accompanied by six small metal fragments. (Note: Bezymenski attributes this to splinters from Soviet shelling while the bodies were burning in the garden.) Pieces of a glass ampule were found in the mouth, and the smell of bitter almonds which accompanies death from cyanide poisoning was present; this was ruled to be the cause of death.

==== Goebbels family ====
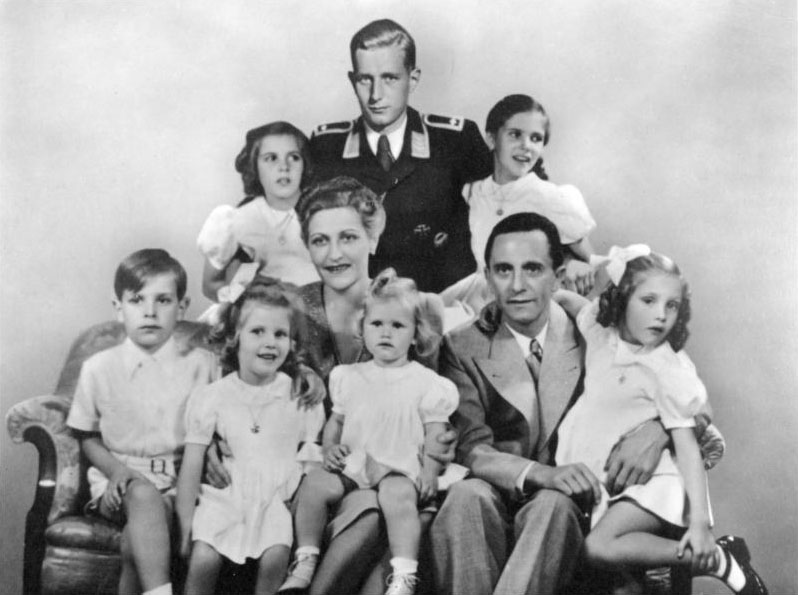
Magda and Joseph Goebbels surrounded by their children, who (except for Magda's earlier son Harald Quandt at top center) all died by cyanide poisoning in the bunker—the six children killed by their parents with the help of Dr. Stumpfegger

The partly burnt body of Joseph Goebbels and the remains presumed to be Magda Goebbels were discovered near the bunker emergency exit by Ivan Klimenko on 2 May 1945, reportedly after a German notified him of their presence. The next day, Senior Lieutenant Ilyin found the bodies of the Goebbels children in one of the rooms of the Chancellery bunker. The bodies were identified by Vizeadmiral Voss, Chancellery cook Wilhelm Lange, and Karl Schneider (referred to as the head garage mechanic), "all of whom knew [the Goebbels family] well". The autopsies of two of the children are listed as taking place on 7 and 8 May; all six children were determined to have died from cyanide poisoning. Autopsies for Joseph and Magda were conducted on 9 May.

Joseph Goebbels's body was "heavily scorched", but was identified by his size, estimated age, shortened right leg and related orthopedic appliance, as well as his head and dental characteristics, including many fillings. His lower right arm was missing, with the remaining stump charred and crumbling. His genitals were "greatly reduced in size, shrunken, dry". Chemical testing revealed cyanide compounds in the internal organs and blood; cyanide poisoning was judged to be the cause of death.

The body presumed to be Magda's was scorched beyond recognition. Voss identified two items found on the corpse as having been in her possession: a cigarette case inscribed "Adolf Hitler—29.X.34", which she had used for the last three weeks of her life, and Hitler's Golden Party Badge, which the dictator had given her three days before his suicide. Additionally, a reddish-blond hairpiece was identified as matching the color of one Magda wore. Her dental remains, including both a maxilla and mandible with dental work, were found loose on the corpse along with splinters from a thin-walled ampule; the cause of death was ruled to be cyanide poisoning.

==== General Krebs ====
General Krebs is erroneously listed in the autopsy report as "Major General Krips" (as Bezymenski notes). His autopsy was conducted on 9 May. Cyanide compounds were detected in the internal organs and the smell of bitter almonds was recorded, leading the commission to conclude that Krebs's death was "obviously caused by poisoning with cyanide compounds". Three light head wounds were presumed to have been obtained from his death fall onto a protruding object.

==== Dogs ====
A German Shepherd matching Hitler's dog Blondi's description appears to have died from cyanide poisoning. A small black bitch, about 60 centimeters (2 ft) long and 28 cm (1 ft) tall, was poisoned by cyanide before being shot in the head. Both dogs were unburnt.

=== Photographs ===
Sixteen pages of previously unreleased photographs include those of Ivan Klimenko, the locations of Hitler's burning and burying site outside the Führerbunker's emergency exit, SMERSH agents supposedly exhuming Hitler and Braun's remains, a diagram of where the corpses of Hitler, Braun, Joseph and Magda Goebbels were burned, Hitler and Braun's alleged corpses in boxes, Hitler's dental remains, a sketch drawn Käthe Heusermann on 11 May 1945 to identify Hitler's dental remains, Braun's dental bridge, the first and last page of Hitler's autopsy report, the Soviet autopsy commission with both Krebs's and Joseph Goebbels's corpses, the bodies of the Goebbels family, the bodies of Krebs and the Goebbels children at Plötzensee Prison, and Blondi's corpse.

== Criticism and legacy ==
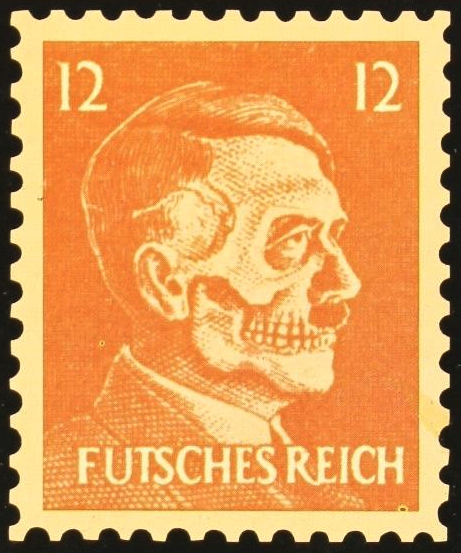
A 1940s U.S.-forged stamp depicting Hitler, as it appears on the 1978 Jove Books mass-market paperback edition's cover

Upon the book's publication, Hugh Trevor-Roper wrote that it was "remarkable that [Bezymenski's] book is apparently for Western consumption only", with no Russian release and the book's original language apparently being German. Trevor-Roper says, "No explanation is offered of these interesting facts, which suggest a propagandist rather than an historical purpose." In 1969, Reuben Ainsztein compared Bezymenski's account to that of Soviet war interpreter Elena Rzhevskaya, whom he says implied that "the investigating team completed its investigations against [Stalin's] wishes". Ainsztein criticizes Bezymenski for failing to explain why he ostensibly blames Shirer and Bullock for helping "foster the legend that [Hitler] shot himself like a man". In his 1971 book about Hitler, German historian Werner Maser expresses doubt about Bezymenski's book, including the autopsy's insinuation that Hitler had only one testicle. Journalist Ron Rosenbaum and historian Sjoerd de Boer opine that this narrative suited Stalin's desire to portray Hitler as a coward who died by either poison or a coup de grâce.

In 1972, forensic odontologists Reidar F. Sognnaes and Ferdinand Strøm reconfirmed Hitler's dental remains based on X-rays of Hitler taken in 1944, the 1945 testimony of Käthe Heusermann and Fritz Echtmann, as well as the Soviet description of the dental remains. The same decade, Sognnaes argued (along with Trevor-Roper) that despite the book's flaws, the dental remains proved the body was Hitler's, omitting their being found loose and the mandible sundered at the alveolar process. After initially believing that the Soviets had examined Braun's corpse, by 1981 Sognnaes was convinced that this was false after Heusermann reputedly told him that Braun had never actually been fitted for a dental bridge (though one had been made for her). In 2023, Mark Felton noted that the alleged autopsy reported natural teeth where Braun had artificial molars as well as caries, though Braun maintained good dental hygiene even through the mid-1940s.

Elena Rzhevskaya, who safeguarded the dental remains until they could be identified by Hitler's dental staff, claimed to have seen Hitler's charred corpse in the Chancellery garden. According to her, the dental remains were removed during the alleged autopsy (at which Bezymenski asserts she was not present) and the pages of the (initially handwritten) report about them were recorded on "two large non-standard sheets of paper". Shkaravsky (d. 1975) provided British filmmakers his Russian typewritten copy. Additionally, he wrote to Rzhevskaya that the commission had been forbidden to photograph Hitler's body for unknown reasons, also suggesting that the damage to Braun's chest could have been from shrapnel. According to Lindloff, who cremated Hitler and Braun's bodies, after only 30 minutes the bodies were "already charred and torn open", in part caused by shrapnel.

In the 1970s, Traudl Junge argued that Hitler resigned himself to death because he lacked the strength to even raise a gun to keep fighting. In his 1975 book The Bunker, journalist James P. O'Donnell dismisses the claim that hand tremors would have prevented Hitler from pulling the trigger because only his left hand shook badly. O'Donnell further writes that "Hitler lacked many human qualities; but, really, did he lack a strong will?" O'Donnell dismisses Bezymenski's implication that Hitler could not have shot himself after taking poison, stating that "few if any poisons act instantly, [and] certainly not cyanide".

=== Revised edition ===
In 1982, a revised edition of the book was released in German. Bezymenski cites Sognnaes and Strøm (whose 1972 report is included in English) as supporting his view that Hitler's confirmed dental remains prove that the Soviets found his body. (However, Sognnaes concluded in 1981 that Braun's alleged remains may have been a forensic fraud.) Another scientist sympathetic to Bezymenski's view found the exit wound on the parietal skull fragment to be larger on top and thus likely to have been fired through the mouth. (Note: Exit wounds are typically irregular, with multiple points of reference establishing trajectory.) Bezymenski states that no bullet was found, not even lodged in the skull (as he acknowledges is possible at certain trajectories). In addition to Hitler's hand tremors, Bezymenski cites a psychiatrist who asserted in Who Killed Hitler? (1947) that the dictator's psychology would have prevented him from firing the suicide shot. Bezymenski claims to have only recently learned of the 1947 book, despite writing in 1968 that the Soviets thought Günsche delivered a coup de grâce-style shot. Bezymenski claims that the 1947 book argues for the necessary time window for a coup de grâce-style shot on the basis of eyewitnesses being inconsistent about the timing and severity of the burnings.

=== Later discourse ===
In 1992, Bezymenski wrote that Hitler's corpse was cremated in April 1978, despite asserting in 1968 that it had already been done. A 1992 Der Spiegel article claims that Bezymenski had now learned that the cremation took place in 1970. The article further asserts that the blood type was not determined in 1946 as claimed by the Soviets (as well as self-contradictorily by Heimlich) and that during the 1946 investigation, the Soviets found trickle-like bloodstains on Hitler's sofa, interpreted by Der Spiegel as implying Hitler died slowly. Bezymenski, who described himself as having been "a product of the era and a typical party propagandist", stated that "It is not difficult to guess why the KGB [did not give me findings suggesting Hitler's slow death, as I] was supposed to lead the reader to the conclusion that all talk of a gunshot was a pipe dream or half an invention and that Hitler actually poisoned himself." In a 2003 episode of National Geographic's Riddles of the Dead, Bezymenski elaborates that the KGB only granted him access to the documents in the Soviet archive on the basis that he would maintain the narrative that Hitler died by cyanide and say his remains had been cremated by June 1945.

In 1995, journalist Ada Petrova and historian Peter Watson wrote that they considered Bezymenski's account at odds with Trevor-Roper's report, published as The Last Days of Hitler (1947). Though Petrova and Watson used Bezymenski's book as a source for theirs, they note issues with the SMERSH investigation. They argue that the alleged autopsies of Hitler and Braun failed to a record of dissection of their internal organs, saying it could have proven whether poison was a factor in their deaths, although chemical tests are noted (as with the other bodies examined). Petrova and Watson opine that it was dissatisfaction of this first investigation, along with concerns of the findings of Trevor-Roper, that led to Stalin ordering a second commission in 1946. Petrova and Watson cite the alleged autopsy report to refute Hugh Thomas's theory that only Hitler's dental remains belonged to him (i.e. being surgically removed), saying that the entire jawbone structure would have had to have been found loose on the alleged body while clamping down on the tongue, which "would presumably be a very difficult arrangement to fake". According to Petrova and Watson, the boxes containing the purported remains of Hitler and Braun were ammunition crates.

Petrova and Watson had the skull fragment examined by a forensic expert, who agreed with the view advanced by Bezymenski in 1982 that the exit wound was larger on top, purportedly implying that the shot was fired from below. Contrarily, Hugh Thomas thought such a shot would have been complicated by the sphenoid bone. He thought a sagittal shot through the forehead was more likely, rare for handgun suicides. Also noting that the fragment was scarcely burnt, Thomas suggested that the evidence of a suicide gunshot was faked (e.g. by the Soviets to please Stalin, as they did in some other cases involving Hitler's death). In his 1983 book, American historian Donald McKale argues that Western authors were wrong to dismiss the alleged autopsy report and that the narrative of Hitler's death by gunshot styled him into a symbol of anti-communism. Simultaneously, McKale states that Stalin stoked the spread of survival stories.

In 1993, a team of French forensicists opined that the Soviets knew the body they examined was not Hitler's and left a clue in their report by recording 15 teeth in the lower jaw (one more than the dental witnesses). However, the left metal bridge is segmented into seven portions anteriorly and five posteriorly, allowing for a total from 13 to 15.

In his 1995 book on Hitler's death, Joachimsthaler criticized Bezymenski's account, arguing that there would have been little more than "calcified bones that can easily disintegrate", which were then subjected to intense artillery bombardment. He reached the same conclusion put forward in 1950 by U.S. jurist Michael Musmanno that the Soviets never found an intact body. Musmanno stated the body would have almost completely burned to ashes. Joachimsthaler implies that another body must have been examined instead, while also pointing out that hydrogen cyanide would have been evaporated by the fire and thus not left an odor. He quotes German pathologist Otto Prokop as saying about the alleged autopsy: "Bezemensky's report is ridiculous. ... Any one of my assistants would have done better ... the whole thing is a farce ... it is intolerably bad work ... the transcript of the post-mortem section of 8 [May] 1945 describes anything but Hitler." Similarly, in 2019 historian Luke Daly-Groves denounced "the dubious autopsy report riddled with scientific inconsistencies and tainted by ideological motivations" and stated that "the Soviet soldiers picked up whatever mush they could find in front of Hitler's bunker exit, put it in a box and claimed it was the corpses of Adolf and Eva Hitler". Only the report's coverage of the dental remains has been substantially verified, with 2017–2018 analysis led by French forensic pathologist Philippe Charlier concluding that the extant evidence "[fits] perfectly" with the Soviet description. Charlier also defended the rest of the alleged autopsy and, more uniquely, part of a skull long claimed by the Soviets to be Hitler's.

On the lack of discovery of a bullet in Hitler's study, Joachimsthaler theorizes that after Hitler fired his Walther PP or PPK at contact range, the bullet passed through one temple and became lodged inside the other, rupturing in a hematoma that looked like an exit wound. Joachimsthaler cites a 1925 study in which seven out of eighteen 7.65-mm bullets fired from pistols at living persons entered but did not exit the head. Only one shot of four fired through the temples did not exit, being fired from a distance and the bullet shattering in the brain. The other exit failures were associated with sagittal or oblique angles.

In their addendum to The Hitler Book (2005), Henrik Eberle and Matthias Uhl quote Bezymenski as admitting in 1995 that his work included "deliberate lies" and criticize his book for advocating the theories that Hitler died by poisoning or a coup de grâce. In 2018, investigative journalists Jean-Christophe Brisard and Lana Parshina speculated that Hitler could have commissioned Linge to shoot him through the temples due to his poor health (e.g. hand tremors), but largely dismiss Bezymenski's book as propagandistic.

In his 2019 book, Daly-Groves notes that Stalin's motivations in claiming Hitler's survival remain unclear, with most scholars concluding that he intended to secure disputed areas of West Germany on the basis that they would be safer under Soviet control if Hitler returned. Alternatively, Stalin may have intended to undermine perceived political opponents such as Zhukov (who had said Hitler was dead), attack rival nations ostensibly harboring Hitler, or motivate his totalitarian forces. Daly-Groves argued that potential undisclosed documents in the Russian archives could end speculation.

In 2022, American military historian Thomas Boghardt wrote that a Bulgarian dentist had been allowed to examine the forensic drawings while working as a translator for the Soviets in mid-1945. While working at the Charité in Berlin later that year, the dentist told the U.S. Counterintelligence Corps that he could confirm the authenticity of Hitler's "jawbone". According to Boghardt, this resolved the matter as far as the Army was concerned, but the lack of additional evidence allowed rumors to swell about Hitler's fate as well as individuals claiming to be his offspring. Boghardt credited the release of the 1968 Soviet book with curbing such claims.

In his 2023 analysis, Mark Felton cites the lack of evidence of a gunshot in Hitler's alleged autopsy and notes the missing left foot, strangely implying amputation; moreover surmises, Braun's dental record proves the body was not hers. Felton's infers that Stalin believed that the couple escaped (while later reports obscured the identification of the two bodies for political purposes). Felton suggests that deception by eyewitnesses would help explain how the Soviets inaccurately identified a body as Braun's, despite it apparently exhibiting an unexplained pre-mortem abdomen wound. Felton surmises that after the real bodies failed to burn completely, certain Nazis procured similar bodies (possibly at the nearby hospital), secured and planted the dental remains on them, interred them outside the bunker, and hid the real bodies nearby. (Note: By their own 1960s accounts, the Soviets did find Hitler's teeth with a body double, but the alleged autopsy removes them to the "oral cavity" of a cyanide-killed charred corpse from a Chancellery crater. This matched the location of Hitler's remains given by three unreliable eyewitnesses.)

In 2025, amid the resurfacing of a purported postwar photograph of Hitler, (Note: In 2023, fringe author Abel Basti published an alleged original print in high resolution, having previously only been declassified as microfilm.) LADbible argued that the U.S. Central Intelligence Agency (CIA) had dismissed the claimed sighting and that the alleged autopsy (filed by the CIA) confirmed the dictator's death. Later in 2025, blood from the sofa where eyewitnesses saw Hitler's lifeless body on 30 April 1945 underwent DNA analysis by Turi King of the University of Bath. The blood was confirmed to be Hitler's by comparing it to a DNA sample from a relative with shared paternal ancestry.
