= Hans-Erich Voss =

German naval officer (1897–1969)

Hans-Erich Voß
- Hans-Erich Voss in Soviet captivity
- Born: 30 October 1897; Angermünde, Regierungsbezirk Potsdam, Province of Brandenburg, Kingdom of Prussia, German Empire
- Died: 18 November 1969 (aged 72); Berchtesgaden, Bavaria, West Germany
- Military career
- Allegiance: German Empire; Weimar Republic; Nazi Germany
- Branch: Imperial German Navy; Reichsmarine; Kriegsmarine
- Service years: 1917–1945
- Rank: Vizeadmiral
- Commands: heavy cruiser Prinz Eugen; Naval Liaison Officer to Hitler's headquarters
- Conflicts: World War I; World War II
- Awards: Iron Cross; Wound Badge of 20 July 1944

Hans-Erich Voss (or Voß, see ß) (30 October 1897 – 18 November 1969) was a German Vizeadmiral (vice admiral) and one of the final occupants of the Führerbunker during the battle of Berlin in 1945. He was also among the last people to see both Adolf Hitler and Joseph Goebbels alive before they committed suicide. After the war in Europe ended, he spent several years in prison in both the Soviet Union and East Germany.

== Military career ==
Voss was born in Angermünde, Brandenburg on 30 October 1897. He graduated from the German Naval Academy in 1917. He served in the Reichsmarine and later in the Kriegsmarine. In 1942, he was commander of the heavy cruiser Prinz Eugen, and met Joseph Goebbels, then Reich Propaganda Minister, when Goebbels accompanied a party of journalists on a tour of the ship. Thereafter, he was promoted to the rank of Konteradmiral and appointed the Naval Liaison Officer to Hitler's headquarters in March 1943.

== 20 July plot ==
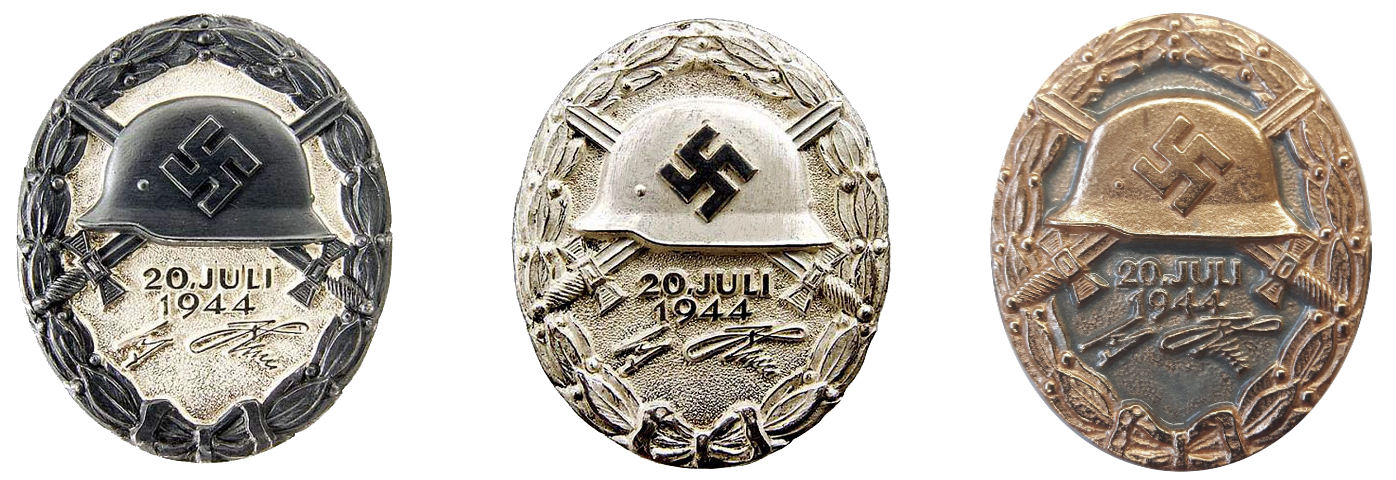
Voss has the alleged distinction of being presented with the 20 July 1944 wound badges in black, silver and gold, although this is sometimes disputed.

Voss was present during the bomb plot attack against Hitler on 20 July 1944. He was in the conference room at Hitler's Rastenburg Headquarters Wolfsschanze ("Wolf's Lair") as the Kriegsmarine representative. Around 12:30 hours as the conference began, plotter Claus von Stauffenberg primed the bomb to explode in ten minutes. The primed bomb was then placed in a briefcase under a table around which Hitler, Voss and more than 20 officers had gathered. Shortly thereafter, Stauffenberg made an excuse to leave the room. While Stauffenberg was hurriedly arranging for a car to take him and his aide to the airfield, the bomb detonated, destroying much of the conference room.

Although Hitler survived with minor wounds, three officers and a stenographer were fatally injured and died soon afterwards. Voss was also wounded in the bomb blast but he quickly recovered. He became a recipient of the Wound Badge of 20 July 1944. Initially his award class was presented in black but then it was upgraded to silver and finally gold because he was wounded a number of times after the initial award. Voss was the only member of the German military to have received all three badges.

== Berlin 1945 ==
In his capacity as Kriegsmarine Liaison Officer, Voss accompanied Hitler, Goebbels and their entourages into the Führerbunker complex under the Reich Chancellery in Berlin. In the final months of Nazi Germany, Voss became a confidante of Goebbels and his wife Magda Goebbels. He was aware that Goebbels had decided that they would not leave the bunker, but would kill their children and then themselves.

=== Führerbunker ===
On 30 April, Voss was among the group of officers whom Hitler informed that he had decided to commit suicide rather than attempt to escape from Berlin, which was surrounded by the Red Army. On that same afternoon, Hitler bade farewell to an assembled group of people, including Voss. Hitler shot himself that same afternoon.

Interrogated by Soviet officers on 6 May, Voss recounted:

When Goebbels learned that Hitler had committed suicide, he was very depressed and said: "It is a great pity that such a man is not with us any longer. But there is nothing to be done. For us, everything is lost now and the only way out left for us is the one which Hitler chose. I shall follow his example".

On 1 May, Voss saw Goebbels for the last time:

Before the breakout from the bunker began, about ten generals and officers, including myself, went down individually to Goebbels's shelter to say goodbye. While saying goodbye I asked Goebbels to join us. But he replied: "The captain must not leave his sinking ship. I have thought about it all and decided to stay here. I have nowhere to go because with little children I will not be able to make it".

Voss then joined the group led by SS-Brigadeführer Wilhelm Mohnke, which broke out of the bunker and tried to escape from Berlin. Most of the group were captured by Soviet forces within a day. Voss was brought back to the bunker for questioning, and to identify the partly burned bodies of Joseph and Magda Goebbels, and also the bodies of their six children, who had been poisoned. The Soviet account states:

Vice-Admiral Voss, being asked how he identified the people as Goebbels, his wife and children, explained that he recognised the burnt body of the man as former Reichsminister Goebbels by the following signs: the shape of the head, the line of the mouth, the metal brace that Goebbels had on his right leg, his gold NSDAP badge and the burnt remains of his party uniform.

According to the Soviet account of their investigation of Hitler's death, Voss was responsible for noticing that one of a number of bodies in a dry water tank strongly resembled Hitler.

== Capture and death ==
Voss was made a Soviet prisoner of war. In August 1951, he was prosecuted by the Soviet authorities on charges that "he held a command post in Hitler's war fleet, that was involved in an aggressive war in breach of international laws and treaties." In February 1952, the Court Martial of the Moscow Military District sentenced him to 25 years' imprisonment. By a decree of the Praesidium of the Supreme Soviet in December 1954, however, he was released and handed over to the German Democratic Republic authorities. He was released by East Germany (GDR) on 21 January 1955. Voss died at Berchtesgaden in Bavaria in 1969.

== Promotions ==
- 5 July 1915 War Volunteer and Seekadett-Anwärter (Sea Officer Candidate)
- 27 January 1916 Überetatmäßiger Bootsmannsmaat (Boatswain's Mate)
- 19 April 1916 Fähnrich zur See (Officer Cadet)
- 17 September 1917 Leutnant zur See (2nd Lieutenant)
  - 27 March 1919 Leutnant zur See der Reserve (2nd Lieutenant of the Reserves) with effect from 31 March 1919
  - 9 September 1920 Leutnant zur See (active 2nd Lieutenant) with effect from 1 October 1920
- 10 January 1921 Oberleutnant zur See (1st Lieutenant)
- 1 January 1928 Kapitänleutnant (Lieutenant Captain)
- 1 October 1934 Korvettenkapitän (Corvette Captain / Lieutenant Commander)
- 1 November 1937 Fregattenkapitän (Frigate Captain / Commander)
- 1 November 1939 Kapitän zur See (Captain at Sea / Captain / Colonel)
- 1 March 1943 Konteradmiral (Rear Admiral)
- 1 August 1944 Vizeadmiral (Vice Admiral)

== Bibliography ==
- de Boer, Sjoerd (2022) [2021]. The Hitler Myths: Exposing the Truth Behind the Stories about the Führer. Frontline Books. ISBN 978-1-39901-905-7.
- Joachimsthaler, Anton (1999) [1995]. The Last Days of Hitler: The Legends, The Evidence, The Truth. Translated by Helmut Bölger. London: Brockhampton Press. ISBN 978-1-86019-902-8.
- Kershaw, Ian (2008). Hitler: A Biography. New York: W. W. Norton & Company. ISBN 978-0-393-06757-6.
- Vinogradov, V. K.; Pogonyi, J.F.; Teptzov, N.V. (2005). Hitler's Death: Russia's Last Great Secret from the Files of the KGB. London: Chaucer Press. ISBN 978-1-904449-13-3.
