= Alleged doubles of Adolf Hitler =

The corpse of an alleged Hitler body double with a gunshot wound to the forehead and a battered right temple (filmed by the Soviets)

There is no evidence that Adolf Hitler, the dictator of Nazi Germany, used look-alikes as political decoys during his life, but it has been the subject of speculation. Some stories about his death and replacement by a double were propagated as early as 1939. After capturing Berlin, the Soviet Union claimed that the dictator used a body double to fake his death and escape, which Western scholars regard as disinformation. The Soviets supposedly found a number of similar bodies, with only Hitler's dental remains ever positively identified. (Note: In addition to a maxillar golden bridge, Hitler's dental remains include part of a mandible broken and burned around the alveolar process.) (Note: Several witnesses, some historians and authors argue that Hitler and Braun's bodies were burnt nearly to ashes or at least unrecognizable corpses, with the heavy bombardment of the area also having an effect. However, the fragment of Hitler's jawbone was only burnt on the edges of the alveolar process, where it was sundered from the rest of the jaw. Even extreme burning does not typically disintegrate bones, with German forensic biologist Mark Benecke arguing that body water would hinder an open-air cremation.) (Note: Forensic odontologist Reidar F. Sognnaes became convinced that an alleged Soviet autopsy of Eva Braun's corpse was false as it did not match her dental records. Most damningly, Braun was reportedly never fitted for a bridge—allegedly found loose on the corpse.)

The most prominent evidence of a Hitler double is Soviet footage of a body with a gunshot wound to the forehead, ostensibly found in the Reich Chancellery garden. The Soviets initially thought this body was Hitler's (and later sometimes claimed it was), but dismissed it partly because it was wearing mended socks. (Note: Hitler's solitary chef, Constanze Manziarly, had sought darning thread months before to conserve her wardrobe. A chauffeur reportedly identified the Hitler body double as a staff cook. In cross-examination, Hitler's chauffeur, Erich Kempka, alleged that he mended a hole on one of Hitler's socks a couple of nights before the dictator's death and that he identified this while handling the body. Several others said Hitler's body was wearing his customary socks, some specifying that they were silk, but not that they were mended.) (Note: In 2009, a skull fragment claimed to be Hitler's, which had a posterior exit wound through the right parietal bone, was determined to have female DNA.) Fringe and conspiracy theorists cite the body's existence as evidence that Hitler faked his death.

== Background ==
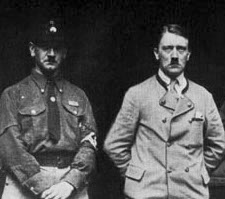
Adolf Hitler (right) and his chauffeur Julius Schreck (left) in 1925; both wore a toothbrush mustache.

The 1939 book The Strange Death of Adolf Hitler alleges that the Nazi Party used four people as doubles for Hitler, including the author, who claims that the real dictator died in 1938 and that he subsequently took his place. The book is not remotely reliable, being regarded as farcical even in the year of its release. In 1939, the Newspaper Enterprise Association (NEA), while admitting that the book has "practically no direct evidence of authenticity", defended it by dubiously citing the purported death of Julius Schreck in 1938 (Note: Reliable sources place Schreck's death in May 1936, in conjunction with meningitis.) as support for Hitler's use of doubles. The NEA claimed that after Schreck had ceased to be Hitler's chauffeur (in 1934), he was riding in the back of a car being driven by Hitler in 1938 when he took a bullet from a would-be Hitler assassin who did not expect Hitler to be driving. The NEA also cited public appearances of Hitler look-alikes in Europe as fueling belief in his use of doubles: one man was photographed in 1935 in Nice, France, wearing a pinstripe suit (said to have been accompanied by two bodyguards and to have caused a commotion) and another in 1936, spotted at the zoo in Vienna, Austria.

Hitler's dental remains, the only part of his body confirmed to have been found

On 25 April 1945, Hitler instructed Schutzstaffel (SS) valet Heinz Linge to ensure that his body was burned to avoid falling into Soviet hands, asserting, "They would make a spectacle in Moscow out of my body and put it in waxworks." On 26 April, Stockholm's Free German Press Service circulated a rumor that a Hitler double named August Wilhelm Bartholdy, supposedly a former grocer from Plauen, was called to Berlin to be filmed by Hitler's photographer, Heinrich Hoffman, dying on the battlefield in Hitler's stead. The Germans émigrés stated, "He will act as Hitler's trump card, creating a hero legend around the Führer's death, while Hitler himself goes underground." This prompted a Stockholm journalist to speculate that Hitler's manner of death would most likely be suicide in his bunker. Allied officials cautioned against prematurely accepting presumptions of Hitler's death, noting that it would be exactly what he wanted. By 27 April, the London Star asked,

What could be easier than for the Germans to produce an unrecognizable body and say that it was Hitler's while Hitler himself was making his getaway by plane or submarine?

According to eyewitnesses, Hitler died in Berlin on 30 April, with his dental remains subsequently being positively identified. Additional remains of himself or his wife of one day, Eva Braun, were never provably discovered.

== Supporting claims ==
On 2 May 1945, the day Berlin fell, an official Soviet newspaper declared the German report of Hitler's death to have been a Nazi trick. On 9 May, The New York Times reported that a body was claimed by the Soviets to belong to Hitler. This was disputed by an anonymous servant, who stated that the body was that of a cook who was killed because of his resemblance to Hitler, and that the latter had escaped via a faked death. On 6 June 1945, Western correspondents cited the statements of Soviet Marshal Georgy Zhukov's staff that four bodies resembling Hitler had been found in the Führerbunker, purportedly burnt by the Red Army's flamethrowers; one body was considered most likely to be Hitler's, chemically determined to have died by poison. A few days later, on Soviet leader Joseph Stalin's orders, Zhukov presented the official narrative that Hitler had escaped, stating, "We have found no corpse that could be [his]." In mid-1945, a Soviet major told American sources that Hitler had survived and claimed his body was not found burned in the Reich Chancellery garden, stating, "Our experts have established that the man found here didn't look like Hitler at all." Similarly, the British Daily Herald cited a major who was reputedly the first Soviet to enter the garden, where he saw the body of "a double—and not even a good double". During their Soviet captivity, Heinz Linge, SS guard Josef Henschel, and Hitler's pilot Hans Baur were interrogated about whether Hitler escaped by leaving a body double. Baur later told American journalist James P. O'Donnell that although he never saw a double, Hitler's security detail may have kept one or more "on tap" in case Hitler "decided to take part in a breakout ... to camouflage or facilitate his escape". O'Donnell opined that after Hitler's death, any imposter would have been killed to save face.

According to the dubious 1947 American book Who Killed Hitler?, Reichsführer-SS Heinrich Himmler previously employed several Hitler doubles as political decoys and knew of one in the Führerbunker. This unnamed double was "about 54" or perhaps younger, "[having] been groomed for [non-speaking] public functions in the earlier years" when Hitler was healthy; thus, he could not deceive those familiar with the elder Hitler but might fool the public, being able to "pass as Hitler at a distance of fifty feet" by styling his hair and donning a prop toothbrush mustache. He supposedly began appearing in the kitchen by mid-April 1945, known to only a few of Hitler's servants as a helper to his chef, Constanze Manziarly, said to be exclusively aware if he performed kitchen duties. (Note: Manziarly herself went missing. Hitler's private secretary Traudl Junge (an unreliable witness) stated that Manziarly cooked a posthumous meal for Hitler to delay news of his death. Junge said she last saw Manziarly taken by Soviet soldiers into a transit tunnel on 2 May 1945. A note in Junge's memoir surmises that Manziarly could have taken poison.) He was not allowed above ground nor seen outside the kitchen except by an SS escort (undercover as a servant) with whom he shared a room in an area "neither visible nor accessible" to other staff. (Note: In 2025, historian Mark Felton surmised that the Reich Chancellery hospital and the nearby garage of Hitler's chauffeur, Erich Kempka, were possible places a decoy body could be found and stored, respectively.) The kitchen servants reputedly pitied the duplicate, sensing that "whatever fate overtook Hitler also would overtake" him. Himmler supposedly had to reckon with the double's existence after hatching a plan to assassinate Hitler via the dictator's physician Ludwig Stumpfegger. (Note: Hitler's main physician, Theodor Morell, had been ordered to leave Berlin on 20 April 1945. The 1947 book claims that on 21 April 1945, Hitler sacked Morell due to suspicions the physician intended to poison him. After Morell left the bunker, his duties were performed by Dr. Werner Haase and Linge.) (Note: By 8 May 1945, the Soviets identified a body with a gunshot wound they thought was Hitler's, but a Nazi servant debunked it, citing its cheap clothing. One unreliable SS eyewitness inconsistently stated that he recalled no details of the burning body's clothing and also claimed to recognize Hitler's mustache. Kempka countered that the upper body was covered by a blanket, the lower portion burnt. (The 1947 book argues that any hair would have burned quickly.)) Besides Hitler's use of living decoys likely being false, the story about Hitler being murdered on Himmler's orders has, in the words of historian Richard J. Evans, "never been taken seriously".

According to a 8 May 1945 Soviet report, Hitler's body was found on the bunker grounds, bullet-riddled and seemingly beaten before and after death; it was captured in a series of photographs and identified as Hitler by several members of his staff, except for a chauffeur and maid, the former saying it was the body of a staff cook he knew intimately and was apparently killed to help Hitler escape. In November 1945, the Federal Bureau of Investigation received a claim that Hitler was living with two doubles in a sub-hacienda complex around northeast Argentina. From 1951 to 1972, the American tabloid National Police Gazette ran stories alleging Hitler's survival, with plots like Stumpfegger employing brain surgery to paralyze the double, switching him or her in for Hitler. In 2017, the Gazette observed that a switch would be noticed by fewer witnesses the later it took place, opining that it was most likely that a body double was planted at the presumptive moment of Hitler's death. Richard Evans notes that tabloid magazines such as the Gazette have made a "career" out of sensational stories about Hitler.

In 1963, author Cornelius Ryan interviewed General B. S. Telpuchovski, a Soviet historian who was allegedly present during the aftermath of the Battle of Berlin. Telpuchovski claimed that on 2 May 1945, a burnt body he thought belonged to Hitler was found wrapped in a blanket. (Note: Soviet Marshal Vasily Chuikov wrote in his 1964 memoirs that Hitler's body was found on 2 May. According to Soviet war interpreter Elena Rzhevskaya, this is the day Joseph Goebbels and a woman presumed to be his wife were discovered, but Hitler's body was not unearthed until 4 May.) (Note: Soviets also told Ryan in 1963 that Hitler's body had been cremated outside of Berlin, which was later claimed to have occurred in 1970.) By 1964, Marshal Vasily Chuikov similarly asserted that on 2 May, the Soviets found "a still-smoking rug" containing the "scorched body of Hitler". According to Telpuchovski, this individual had an exit wound through the back of the head (Note: The filmed double had a gunshot wound to the forehead along with a bruised right temple.) and several dental bridges were found next to the body because "the force of the bullet had dislodged them from the mouth", (Note: A U.S. official related in 1947 that Hitler Youth leader Artur Axmann surmised that Hitler's body had not been identified partly because "the impact of the shot fired into his mouth destroyed his dental fixtures".) ostensibly from an oral gunshot. (Note: Despite early statements by key eyewitnesses about the gunshot being through the mouth, Anton Joachimsthaler regarded a shot from the right to left temple as correct. In 2017–18, forensic analysis was conducted on Hitler's dental remains, which did not detect any gunpowder.) In his 1965 biography of Stalin, English Robert Payne claimed that this body was Hitler's, as did Ryan in his 1966 book, The Last Battle, saying the corpse had been found "under a thin layer of earth". (Note: Anton Joachimsthaler asserts that this double was different from the one that was filmed.) According to Telpuchovski, a total of three Hitler candidates had been burnt, apparently including a body double wearing mended socks which he described as being in "remnants". Ryan quotes him as saying, "There was also the body of a man who was freshly killed but not burned."

=== Film of body double ===
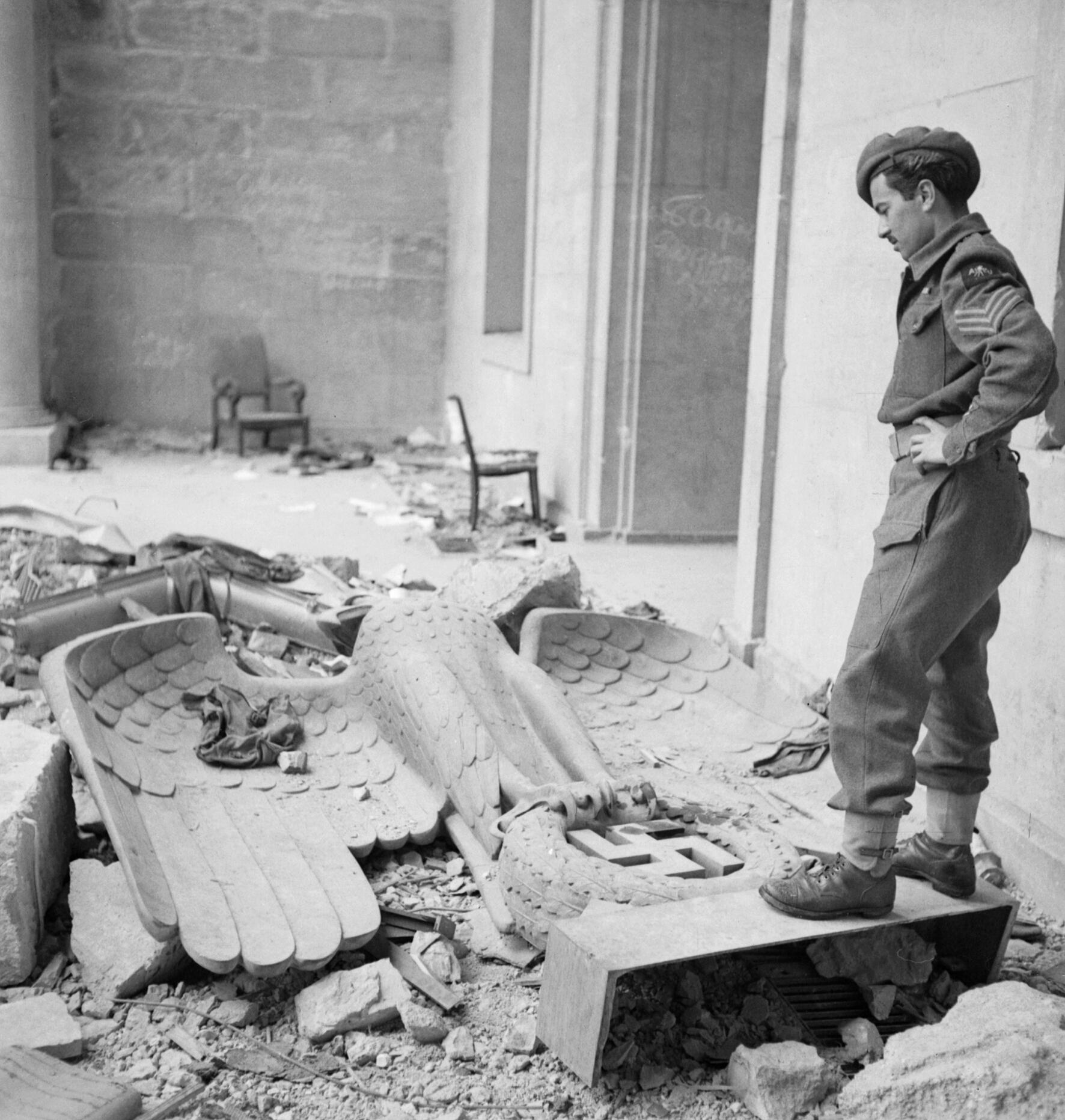
The alleged double was filmed next to a fallen Nazi eagle in the ruins of the New Reich Chancellery courtyard (July 1945, British Army Film and Photographic Unit). (Note: The linen on one wing resembles the cloth swaddling the body double's torso, as filmed at the same location. The body of Hitler (or a similar body) was supposedly found in a "smoking rug" along with the dictator's dental remains. Eyewitnesses affirm that a blanket exposed most of Hitler's limbs.)

Soviet journalist Lev Bezymenski details the darned-sock-wearing double in his 1968 Soviet propaganda book, The Death of Adolf Hitler, which novelly provided details of Hitler's dental remains while implying they were found in the mouth of a different body. Bezymenski quotes Ivan Klimenko, the commander of the Red Army's SMERSH unit, as stating that on the night of 3 May 1945, he witnessed Vizeadmiral Hans-Erich Voss seem to recognize a corpse as Hitler's in a dry firefighting water tank filled with other bodies in the Reich Chancellery garden. Although Klimenko had some doubts because the corpse was wearing mended socks, he briefly speculated that it belonged to Hitler. On 4 May, Soviet officers had the body double filmed. In the 1982 edition of his book, Bezymenski cites the cameraman behind the footage as saying that the body had been brought inside the Chancellery for identification by Germans, most of whom thought it was not Hitler; the body was then brought outside to be filmed in better lighting.

The footage shows the double with an apparent gunshot wound to the forehead. The right temple is battered and traces of dark liquid appear around the mouth and nostrils, as well as a (potentially fake) toothbrush mustache. Certain upper teeth are visible and a portrait of Hitler sits on the torso. According to Klimenko, later on 4 May, Hitler and Braun's true remains were discovered buried in a crater outside the Chancellery, wrapped in blankets and reburied, then re-exhumed the next day after the double was debunked as being Hitler. A 1945 Soviet television documentary implied the footage showed Hitler, with the tabloid Komsomolskaya Pravda later saying it was Hitler's double. In 1992, journalist Ada Petrova found the footage in the Russian state archives; the body double had reputedly been identified as Gustav Weler. (Note: The same film reel contained footage of the remains of Joseph and Magda Goebbels, as well as those of their children.) In their 1995 book, Petrova and Peter Watson opined that 'Weler' may have worked a menial job in the Reich Chancellery and occasionally stood in for Hitler as a political decoy.

== Arguments against ==
According to a purported Soviet biography dated January 1946, Gustav Weler was born in Pomerania in 1886 and later lived in Berlin. In 1924, he was sentenced to three years in prison for counterfeiting banknotes. In January 1932 he joined the Sturmabteilung, but was expelled after two months for failing to cut his hair. In 1933–34, due to Hitler's rise to power, the Gestapo summoned Weler and implored him to cut his hair and mustache to keep him from resembling the chancellor; the repeated summons prompted Weler's attempted suicide via illuminating gas. In 1934, Himmler offered Weler 1,000 Reichsmarks to shave, asserting that Weler would "disappear forever" if he continued to resist. He was not a Nazi Party member and in 1944 moved to a village in Bernau, where he was still alive, working as a roofer.

Hitler's pilot Hans Baur wrote in his memoir that c. 1934, Johann Rattenhuber, then head of the Reichssicherheitsdienst, had found a potential doppelgänger for Hitler and asked Baur to see if Hitler wanted to employ him for that purpose. This prompted the dictator's laughter, saying it was a trick more befitting of Stalin. While in Soviet captivity and being questioned about Hitler's possible escape via a body double, Baur told the Soviets that Rattenhuber might be able to help them contact the man; the Soviets dubiously claimed that they successfully contacted him. In 1955, SS guard Hans Hofbeck said that during his Soviet captivity, he was asked about Hitler's alleged body double; he told the Soviets about a porter—who worked in the Reich Chancellery—with similar facial features, hairstyle, and mustache, but was slightly shorter and thinner. Hofbeck stated that the man wore his brown office uniform, that was the same color as the Party one and comrades sometimes jokingly called him "Führer". Hofbeck also stated that in 1946 he witnessed Baur telling the Soviets that the Nazis had once found a baker from Breslau (modern Poland) who strongly resembled Hitler, but the dictator refused to employ him as a doppelgänger. Contradictorily, Hofbeck also claimed that he learned about the Breslau man from Rattenhuber.

During his Soviet captivity, Heinz Linge argued that a double could not have died in Hitler's stead because the dictator did not use doubles and would have been seen if he had fled. Presiding judge at the Einsatzgruppen trial at Nuremberg Michael Musmanno wrote in 1948, "There is not a shred of evidence to show that Hitler ever had a double." Musmanno further states that "the several score immediate associates of Hitler whom I questioned expressly stated that Hitler never had a double." Among these, Hitler's chief secretary, Johanna Wolf, considered the use of a double in the Führerbunker an impossibility. Musmanno wrote in his 1950 book about Hitler's death:

To suggest as some sophomorically reasoning theorists have, including the noted author Emil Ludwig, that possibly it was a double of Hitler who died and was cremated is, without any evidence to support it, about as rational as to say that Hitler was carried away by angels. ... it is inconceivable that Hitler, with his self-assurance of superiority over any other human being, would concede the existence of anyone even superficially an artificial duplicate of himself.

Soviet war interpreter Elena Rzhevskaya (who safeguarded Hitler's dental remains until they could be identified by his dental staff) attributed the rumours of doubles to Soviet Colonel General Nikolai Berzarin's pledge to nominate the discoverer of Hitler's corpse for the Hero of the Soviet Union award, causing multiple potential bodies to be presented. In his 1995 book on Hitler's death, historian Anton Joachimsthaler implies that the Soviets may have falsified the body double because they failed to find Hitler's body; Musmanno opined that Hitler's body must have been burnt to near-ashes. Joachimsthaler concluded there would be little more than calcified bones and charred tissue left that was then subjected to intense artillery bombardment in the end. Certain scientific studies opine that the open-air burning would not have disintegrated bone. Historian Mark Felton further surmises that after the cremations failed, the Germans planted the dental remains on other cadavers, perhaps taken from the nearby hospital—explaining certain defects—and expertly concealed Hitler and Braun's real bodies.

Historian Peter Hoffmann, a specialist on Hitler's security units, similarly doubts that he ever used doubles. Historian Sjoerd deBoer also states that the stories of a double are highly suspect and found no evidence to support that one was used in Berlin in April 1945 or that Hitler escaped. He concludes that these stories were part of the post-war Soviet disinformation campaigns regarding Hitler's fate.

== Legacy ==
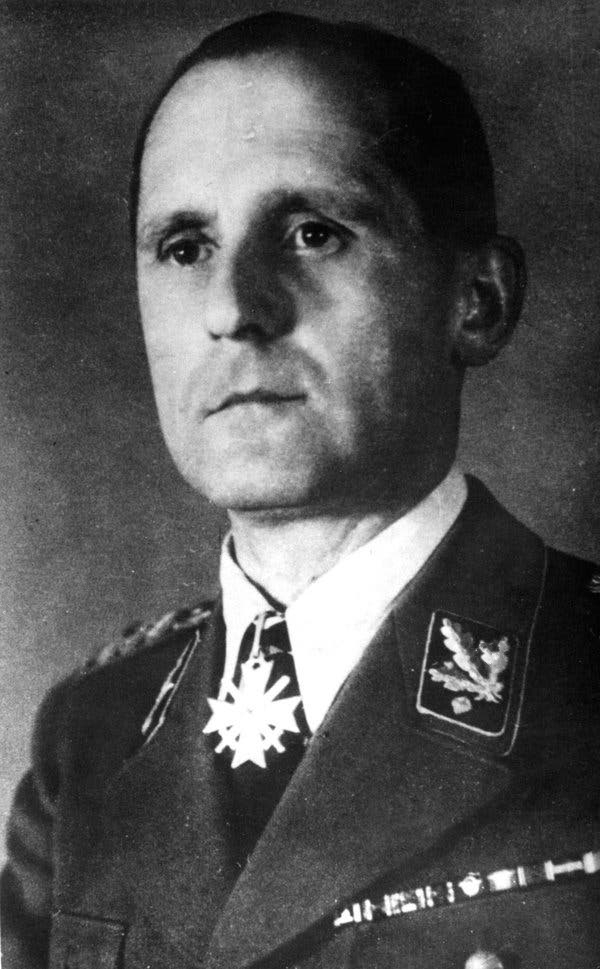
In 1988, it was dubiously claimed that Gestapo chief Heinrich Müller (missing in action as of May 1945) had survived the war and told the U.S. that a double was used to help Hitler escape.

The false implication that footage of a body double showed Hitler's corpse in a 1945 Soviet documentary was corrected in a 1966 documentary. In September 1992, Ada Petrova edited a still of the footage into a Russian television broadcast, which was criticized for implying the body was Hitler's. A few days later, Bezymenski claimed that the double was unique from the body identified as Hitler, which he reaffirmed that the Soviets had found elsewhere in the Chancellery garden.

Joachimsthaler disputes the purported Soviet autopsy report of Hitler's body (published by Bezymenski in 1968), quoting esteemed German pathologist Otto Prokop as saying it "describes anything but Hitler". Similarly, historian Luke Daly-Groves states that "the Soviet soldiers picked up whatever mush they could find in front of Hitler's bunker exit, put it in a box and claimed it was the corpses of Adolf and Eva Hitler". Also in 1995, Bezymenski disclosed that his work had contained "deliberate lies", evidently including the manner of Hitler's death. In his book, he had claimed that if the dictator died from a gunshot wound, it was a coup de grâce to ensure his quick death after he took cyanide, not a suicide by gunshot.

In July 1988, author Ian Sayer received from an anonymous individual a 427-page document, purported to be a photocopy of a U.S. Army Counterintelligence Corps (CIC) file that had been inadvertently released by the U.S. National Archives. Sayer and co-author Douglas Botting had been working on a comprehensive history of the CIC. The dossier alleged that Heinrich Müller had survived the war, had worked for the CIC as an intelligence adviser and to have joined the Central Intelligence Agency (CIA). (Note: Those agencies helped some new allies escape to South America after the war, including SS officer Klaus Barbie, who traded intel with the U.S.) According to Müller's alleged account: a Hitler double was discovered in Breslau in 1941 and was seldom seen after July 1944, being sedated and kept hidden until April 1945; on April 22, Hitler, Braun and three of Hitler's associates departed by air for Hörsching Airport and were then flown to Barcelona; (Note: Besides Hitler and Braun, the alleged passengers were Walther Hewel, Wilhelm Burgdorf, and Hermann Fegelein, with Georg Betz as the pilot.) the double was later killed by a coup de grâce, dressed in Hitler's clothes, wrapped in a blanket and buried near a "pond" near the Chancellery courtyard. Joachimsthaler notes that the plane claimed to have been flown out of Berlin was considered a "total loss" by the Luftwaffe in May 1944, and the Junkers Ju 290 supposedly flown to Barcelona had been grounded in that city since the beginning of April 1945. Sayer's opinion was sought on the veracity of the documents. By this time the anonymous individual (later identified as "Gregory Douglas") had managed to interest Time magazine and The Times newspaper in his story. Historian Richard J. Evans delved into the matter and uncovered that "Gregory Douglas" was a false name used by Peter Stahl, who had far-right connections. He was a known conspiracy-theory author who also dealt in Nazi memorabilia, much of which was fake. Historians such as Joachimsthaler and Daly-Groves regard the dossier, particularly its fringe claims about Hitler's death, as examples of concocted "myths".

Filmmaker Quentin Tarantino said that he opted not to include a bait-and-switch with a double in the version of Hitler's death he depicted in Inglourious Basterds (2009), saying it was something he had "seen before" and that it would be more interesting to "just fucking kill" the dictator.

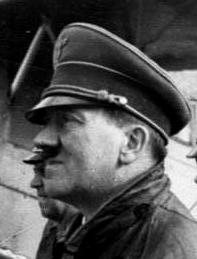
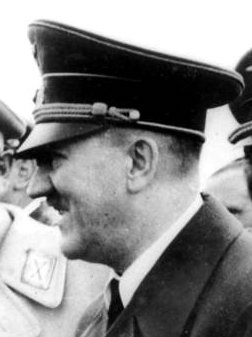
Photographs of Hitler c. 1935 and 1945; between which dates the authors of Grey Wolf (2011) say that a double had begun appearing in the dictator's place (Note: Since the 1950s, forensic scientists have identified individuals via ear measurements, which normally remain proportional for life.)

In a 2009 episode of History's MysteryQuest, a bone-specializing archaeologist collected samples from a skull fragment in the Soviet archives believed to be Hitler's. DNA and forensic examination indicated that the fragment, which had an exit wound on the right parietal bone, belonged to a woman less than 40 years old. On the same program, fringe author H. D. Baumann asserts that Hitler increased his use of doubles after a 1944 assassination attempt. Baumann claims that the darned-sock-wearing double, whose ears he points out are different than Hitler's and who was allegedly two inches shorter, (Note: The purported Soviet autopsy on Hitler's corpse found the body to be about four inches shorter than his known height.) was killed by the Germans on 30 April 1945. Baumann cites the purported account of Müller that Hitler was replaced by a double called Sillip, saying that this explains his weakened and otherwise uncharacteristic appearance. Citing all these details, as well as the implication that the bodies of Hitler and Braun were never found and Stalin's assumption that Hitler escaped to Spain or Argentina, Baumann concludes that Hitler faked his death. He posits that Hitler's dental remains were put in the mouth of the double, with discrepancies between eyewitnesses explained by their loyalty to the ostensibly living Hitler.

In their 2011 book, Grey Wolf: The Escape of Adolf Hitler, British authors Simon Dunstan and Gerrard Williams cite "a noted facial recognition expert witness" in claiming that a double stood in for Hitler on his 20 March 1945 appearance with the Hitler Youth—citing this as the dictator's last public appearance. The book claims that in a deal with the U.S. Office of Strategic Services (the country's intelligence agency during World War II), on 28 April 1945 Hitler's private secretary, Martin Bormann, installed the alleged 20 March imposter and an actress in place of Hitler and Braun, then staged their deaths, possibly with the help of Müller.

Greek conspiracy theorist Peter Fotis Kapnistos, author of 2015 fringe book Hitler's Doubles, claims that Hitler was replaced by a double after he was hospitalized near the end of World War I, citing personality changes and his increased nose width in later photographs. (In fact, there is only evidence of Hitler's enlarged nose close to the end of World War II in Europe.) Kapnistos claims that Hitler had four doubles: Schreck, stenographer Heinrich Berger (who was killed in the 20 July 1944 attempt to kill Hitler), Gustav Weler (whom controversial author W. Hugh Thomas said was found alive after the war), and English occultist Aleister Crowley.

In response to an alleged photograph of Hitler in 1954 (declassified in 2017), History suggested online that this might depict a "crazed" imitator of the dictator—albeit while promoting its series claiming Hitler escaped.

== See also ==
- Ratlines (World War II) – Nazi escape routes
- The Great Dictator – 1940 American film by Charlie Chaplin
- The Strange Death of Adolf Hitler (film) – 1943 American film by James P. Hogan
