= The Strange Death of Adolf Hitler (film) =

1943 American film by James P. Hogan

- Directed by: James P. Hogan
- Written by: Fritz Kortner; Joe May
- Produced by: Ben Pivar; Joseph Gershenson
- Starring: Ludwig Donath; Gale Sondergaard; George Dolenz
- Cinematography: Jerome Ash
- Edited by: Milton Carruth
- Music by: Hans J. Salter
- Distributed by: Universal Pictures
- Release date: September 10, 1943 (US)
- Running time: 74 minutes
- Country: United States
- Language: English

The Strange Death of Adolf Hitler is a 1943 American war film directed by James P. Hogan. The film follows a man who plans to murder Adolf Hitler and steal his identity.

== Plot ==
Franz Huber (Ludwig Donath), an Austrian actor known for his impersonations of celebrities, is captured by the Gestapo and forced to undergo plastic surgery to become a stand-in for Adolf Hitler. The conspirators are planning to poison Hitler and put Huber in his place – and under their control. Huber foils the Gestapo and strikes a blow for democracy; but his life is put in danger because his wife (Gale Sondergaard), who is also an anti-Nazi, doesn't know that her missing husband has become a Hitler look-alike.

== Cast ==
- Ludwig Donath as Franz Huber/Adolf Hitler
- Gale Sondergaard as Anna Huber
- George Dolenz as Herman Marbach
- Fritz Kortner as Bauer
- Ludwig Stössel as Graub
- William Trenk as Colonel Von Zechwitz
- Joan Blair as Duchess Eugenie
- Ivan Triesault as Prince Hohenberg
- Rudolph Anders as Major Mampe
- Ernő Verebes as Count Godeck
- Merrill Rodin as Hans Huber
- Charles Bates as Viki Huber
- Kurt Katch as Colonel Karl Frobe
- Hans Schumm as Major Profe
- Frederick Giermann as Heinrich Himmler
- Richard Ryen as General Palzer
- John Mylong as General Halder
- Kurt Kreuger as Nazi leader
- Lester Sharpe as Dr. Kaltenbach
- Trude Berliner as Frau Reitler
- Hans Heinrich von Twardowski as Judge
- Wolfgang Zilzer as Attorney
- Elizabeth Neumann-Viertel as Mizzi
- Gene Roth as Gen. Diebold

== See also ==
- Hitler's Children
- Hitler – Dead or Alive
- The Hitler Gang
- Look-alike
- The Strange Death of Adolf Hitler
