= Aleksandr Bezymensky =

Soviet poet, screenwriter and journalist (1898–1973)

- Александр Ильич Безыменский
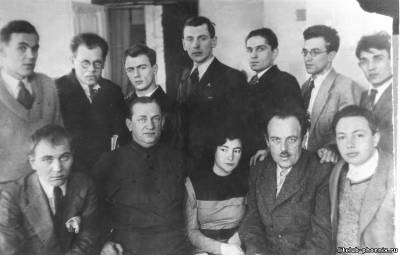
- Bezymensky (sitting second from the right) at the First All-Union Congress of the Union of Soviet Writers
- Born: Aleksandr Ilyich Bezymensky c. 18 January [O.S. 6 January] 1898; Zhytomyr, Volhynian Governorate, Russian Empire (now Ukraine)
- Died: 26 June 1973 (aged 75); Moscow, Russian SFSR, Soviet Union
- Resting place: Novodevichy Cemetery
- Occupations: Poet; screenwriter; journalist
- Children: Lev Bezymensky
- Awards: Full list

Aleksandr Ilyich Bezymensky (Russian: Алекса́ндр Ильи́ч Безыме́нский; c. 18 January [O.S. 6 January] 1898 – 26 June 1973) was a Soviet poet, screenwriter and journalist. He was the father of war historian Lev Bezymensky, who wrote The Death of Adolf Hitler (1968).

== Biography ==
=== Early life ===
Bezymensky was born in Zhytomyr to a middle-class Jewish family. Bezymensky graduated from the gymnasium in Vladimir and entered the Kiev Commercial Institute. He became a member of the Bolshevik Party in 1916.

In 1917, under the Provisional Government, he was mobilized and worked as a teacher. He participated October Revolution and the organization of the Vladimir Union of Communist Youth and edited the newspaper "Struggle and Labor", the journal "Bulletin of the International". He began to print in 1918, published the poem "Revolution" in the Nizhny Novgorod newspaper "Internationale".

In 1918 he was delegated to the First Congress of the Komsomol in Moscow, where he was elected a member of the Central Committee of the RKSM.

In 1919 he was transferred to Kazan, where he taught at the Kazan Military Engineering College.

=== Literary career ===
At the beginning of 1921, on a call from the Central Committee of the RKSM, he arrived in Moscow and worked as an editor of the central Komsomol newspaper Krasnaya Youth. His poems, correspondence anx essays are published in the periodicals of Vladimir and Kazan. The first book of Bezymensky's poems "October Dawns" (1920) was also published in Kazan. The second book of poems, Towards the Sun, was published in Petrograd in 1921.

In 1922, Bezymensky wrote the song "Young Guard", which became widely known. The romantic elation of Bezymensky's poetry determined his popularity among young people. The titles of his books were colorful - "How Life Smells" (1925), "Ways and Roads" (1925), "Song of Life" (1929), "Strikes of the Sun" (1929). At the same time, in the early 1920s, Bezymensky turned from abstract romantic imagery to real, even everyday life concreteness.

From 1922, he contributed to the creation of the literary groups Young Guard, then Oktyabr. Bezymensky takes part in critical attacks on Bulgakov's play The Days of the Turbins.

In 1927 Bezymensky alongside other young Soviet traveled abroad to Czechoslovakia, Austria, Italy, Switzerland, France, the poets spent more than 2 weeks in Sorrento with Maxim Gorky.

In the 1920s, Bezymensky developed satire in various genres - epigrams, captions for caricatures, satirical feuilletons, poems, and a play in verse.

Since 1919, Bezymensky wrote a number of poems: "Young Proletarian", "Komsomol", "War of the Floors", "Day of Our Life", "Town", etc. As a result of the author's numerous trips to the Dneprostroy, the poem "Tragedy Night", dedicated to the labor enthusiasm of builders. The poem received support in the press.

He was a member of the Russian Association of Proletarian Writers (RAPP) and then Litfront group. In 1923 he left the post of editor of the newspaper and completely devoted himself to poetic creativity.

He worked in the traveling editorial offices of the newspapers Pravda and Komsomolskaya Pravda and in factories and the construction of new buildings. He also worked as a screenwriter in Soviet animation. A delegate of the XVI Congress of the All-Union Communist Party (b), where he delivered a speech in verse.

Originally a supporter of the Leon Trotsky, he later became one of his main detractors in the literary field.

In the 1920s and early 1930s, the circulation of his books amounted to one million copies, but his popularity declined in the late 1930s.

=== Later life ===
During the Soviet-Finnish War and the Great Patriotic War, Bezymensky was a political worker and military journalist, his works were published in Pravda, Komsomolskaya Pravda, as well as in the newspapers For the Honor of the Motherland, For Victory. Collections of poems written during the war, "We love life" (1942), "Front notebook" (1946) are published. He was awarded the Order of the Red Banner and Order of the Patriotic War, 1st Class for his services during the war.

After the war, Bezymensky continued to write epigrams, criticizing careerism, flattery, and domestic opportunism.

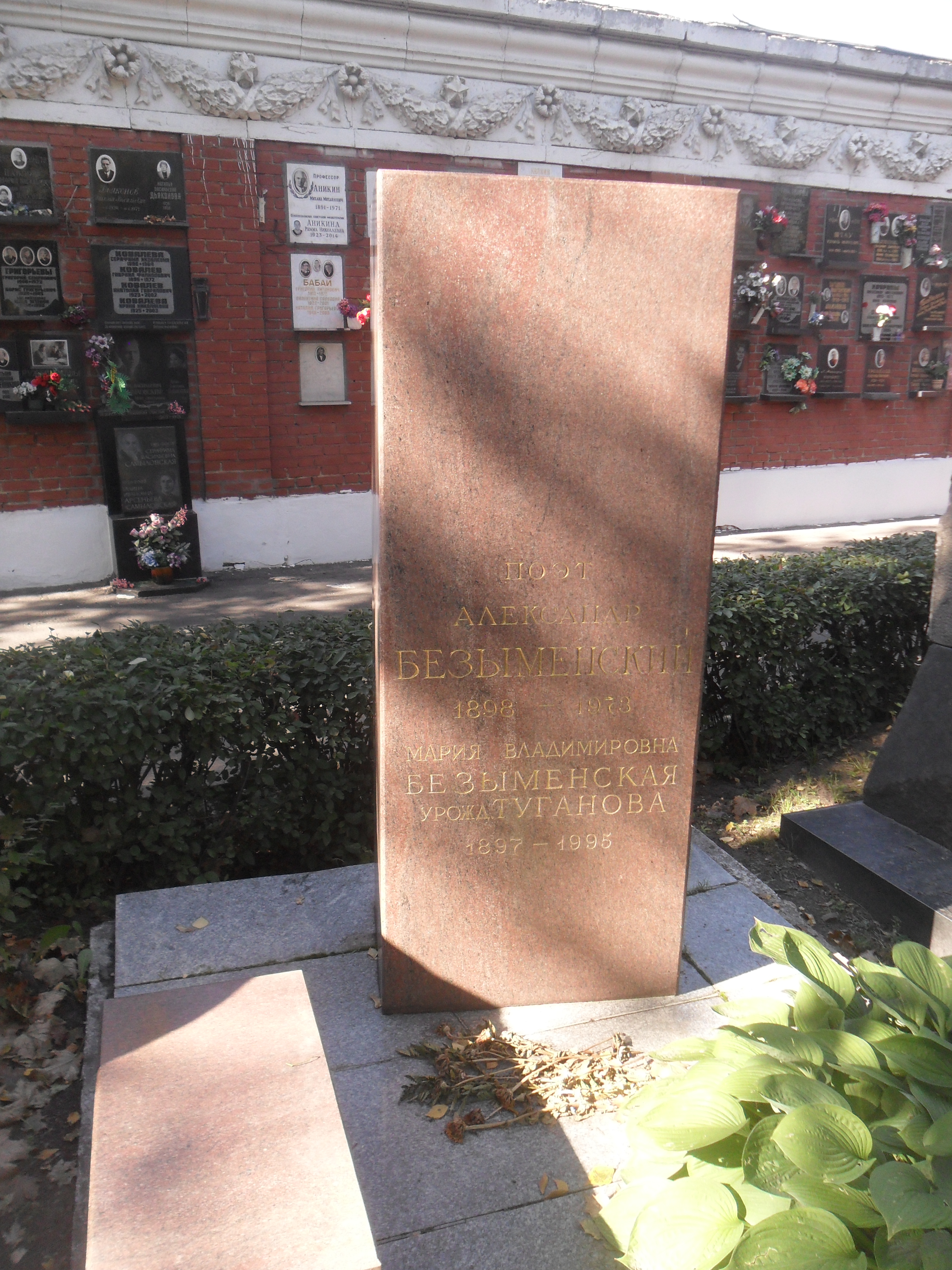
Bezymensky's grave at Novodevichy Cemetery

Aleksandr Bezymensky died on June 26, 1973. He was buried in Moscow at the Novodevichy Cemetery.

His son was the writer, journalist and historian Lev Bezymensky, who wrote the Soviet propaganda book The Death of Adolf Hitler (1968).

== Awards ==
- Order of the October Revolution (01/19/1973)
- Order of the Red Banner (03/29/1943)
- Order of the Patriotic War, 1st class (05/13/1945)
- 2 Orders of the Red Banner of Labor (02/11/1948; 10/28/1967)
- Order of the Red Star (1940)
- Honorary citizen of the city of Vladimir

== Works ==
=== Compositions ===
- Собрание сочинений. Т. 1. М.-Л., Молодая гвардия, 1926
- Собрание сочинений. Т. 1. М., Гослитиздат, 1936
- Избранные произведения 1918—1958, т. 1—2, М., Гослитиздат, 1958;
- Избранные произведения в двух томах. М., Художественная литература, 1989
- Как пахнет жизнь. М., Красная новь, 1924. 88 с. 6 000 экз.; Изд. 2-е — 1925 г.; Изд 3-е — 1927 г.
- Иное солнце. М., Новая Москва, 1924
- Избранные стихи. М., Б-ка «Огонёк», 1925. 48 с. 50 000 экз.
- Иное солнце. М., Московский рабочий, 1925
- Партбилет № 224332. Стихи о Ленине. М.—Л., Гос. изд., 1927. 61 с. 15 000 экз.; Изд. 2-е. 1928. 62 с. 15 000 экз.
- Пути борьбы. (Стихи). М.—Л., Гос. изд., 1929. 55 с. 15 000 экз.; 2-е изд. 1929. 54 с. 15 000 экз.
- Весенняя прелюдия., М.-Л., ЗИФ, 1929, 140 с.
- Выстрел. Комедия в стихах. М.- Л., ГИЗ, 1930 г., 208 с., 5 000 экз.
- Выстрел. Комедия в стихах. М.- Л., ГИЗ, 1930 г., 128 с., 100 000 экз.
- Стихи делают сталь. М.-Л., ГИХЛ, 1930, 92 с.
- Стихи о комсомоле. ОГИЗ, 1932.
- Лучшие строки. М., Федерация, 1932
- Рубеж столетий. М., ГИХЛ, 1933. — 50 с.
- Выстрел. Трагедийная ночь. Социализм. рубеж столетий. М., Советская литература, 1934.
- Стихи о Ленине. М., Молодая гвардия, 1934. — 96 с.
- Стихи о комсомоле. М., Молодая гвардия, 1936. — 174 с.
- Избранные стихи. М., Советский писатель, 1947
- Избранное. М.: Гослитиздат, 1949. — 388 с.
- Гневные строки. М.: Советский писатель, 1949
- Вперед заре навстречу. М., Детгиз, 1958.
- Книга сатиры. М., Советский писатель, 1954, изд. 2-е -1956, изд.3-е - 1961.
- Молот и меч. М., Советская Россия, 1962
- Стихи о войнах, М., 1968;
- Партбилет № 224332. Стихи о Ленине. Воспоминания, М., 1968.
- Закон сердца. М.: Советский писатель, 1971
- Комсомолия. М., Молодая гвардия, 1972
- Миниатюрные максипортреты. М., Советский писатель, 1973
