= European Journal of Internal Medicine =

- Discipline: Internal medicine
- Language: English
- Edited by: Giancarlo Agnelli

Publication details
- History: 1989-present
- Publisher: Elsevier on behalf of the European Federation for Internal Medicine
- Frequency: Monthly
- Open access: Hybrid
- Impact factor: 8.0 (2022)

Standard abbreviations
- ISO 4: Eur. J. Intern. Med.

Indexing
- ISSN: 0953-6205 (print); 1879-0828 (web)
- OCLC no.: 848252516

Links
- Journal homepage; Online access; Online archive

The European Journal of Internal Medicine is a monthly peer-reviewed medical journal that was established in 1989 and is published by Elsevier. It is an official journal of the European Federation of Internal Medicine, the Icelandic Society of Internal Medicine, the Irish Association of Internal Medicine, the Norwegian Society for Internal Medicine, and the Swedish Society of Internal Medicine, and is affiliated with the Polish Society of Internal Medicine and the Turkish Society of Internal Medicine. The journal covers all aspects of internal medicine.

== Abstracting and indexing ==
The journal is abstracted and indexed in:

- CAB Abstracts
- Current Contents/Clinical Medicine
- EMBASE
- MEDLINE/Index Medicus/PubMed
- Science Citation Index Expanded
- Scopus

According to the Journal Citation Reports, the journal has a 2018 impact factor of 3.66.
