= Anton Joachimsthaler =

German historian (born 1930)

- Born: 1930 (age 95–96); Hohenelbe, Czechoslovakia
- Occupation: Historian
- Known for: Works on Hitler's youth and Hitler's last days & death

Anton Joachimsthaler (born 1930 in Hohenelbe) is a German historian. He is particularly noted for his research on the early life of the German dictator Adolf Hitler, in his book Korrektur einer Biografie ("Correction of a Biography") and his last days in the book Hitlers Ende ("Hitler's End"), published in English as The Last Days of Hitler.

== Life ==
Anton Joachimsthaler was born in 1930 in Hohenelbe in the Sudetenland. He studied electrical engineering at the Oskar-von-Miller-Polytechnikum, a predecessor of the Munich University of Applied Sciences. Afterwards he worked in 1956 for the Deutsche Bundesbahn (German Federal Railroad) as a mechanical and electrical engineer in various places, his last position being as a senior service manager in the Munich-Freimann repair station. Since 1969 he has occupied himself with contemporary and railroad history.

== Scholarly work ==
Since the 1970s, Joachimsthaler has produced publications on the history of technology and general history, best known for his works about Adolf Hitler. He has also contributed to television broadcasts from ZDF Mainz, such as Hitler as a private man. His work Korrektur einer Biografie ("Correction of a Biography"), in which he made many facts about Hitler's early years known to a broader public, was particularly well received, and his book Hitlers Ende ("Hitler's End"), which was published in English as The Last Days of Hitler: Legend, Evidence and Truth, is often cited.

Historian Richard J. Evans singled out Joachimsthaler for his "notable... minutely detailed and critical account of the evidence relating to the Nazi leader's early life". He helped to counter the view, expressed by other historians, that the young Hitler was an established anti-semite in the period before the World War I, by highlighting convincing evidence that Hitler developed into a serious anti-semite only during or immediately after the war. This he ascertained from his research in the city archives of Hitler's hometown, Linz, as well as the fact that Stefanie Rabatsch, with whom the young Hitler (according to his boyhood friend August Kubizek) had developed a fanatical love, had the maiden name of "Isak", although she in fact was not Jewish.

Joachimsthaler produced important research into the Breitspurbahn, Hitler's desired 3,000 mm (9 ft 10 1/8 in) broad-gauge railway, more than twice the width of the standard gauge of 1,435 mm (4 ft 8 1/2 in). His first study, published in 1981, is still the standard work.

=== The Last Days of Hitler (1995) ===
Historian Ian Kershaw describes Joachimsthaler's book The Last Days of Hitler: The Legends, The Evidence, The Truth (originally published in German as Hitler's Ende) as a "meticulous study of the testimony and forensic evidence" as to Hitler's last days and death. Dutch historian Sjoerd J. de Boer wrote that Joachimsthaler help put many myths on the topic to rest. De Boer opined that the witnesses and evidence about Hitler's last days were "dealt with exhaustively" and that the book was an important "reaction" to persistent rumors and speculation as to the dictator's death. German historian Joachim Fest credited Joachimsthaler for correcting various inaccuracies of the last days of Nazi Germany that have been stated and restated in past books, and were due mainly to contradictory statements of the people involved.

Joachimsthaler discounted some early eyewitness accounts regarding a suicide gunshot through the mouth, concurring with the later conclusion that Hitler shot himself through the temple. Joachimsthaler attributed conflicting accounts to poor memory formation during the turbulent event. Joachimsthaler concluded that the statements and court testimony of SS-Sturmbannführer Otto Günsche should be held in higher regard than contrary claims.

On the alleged lack of discovery of a bullet in Hitler's study, Joachimsthaler theorizes that after Hitler fired his pistol at contact range, the bullet passed through one temple and became lodged inside the other, rupturing in a hematoma that looked like the temple exit wound reported by eyewitnesses. Joachimsthaler cites a 1925 study which supports such exit failures when not fired transversely at contact range (as later eyewitness accounts said Hitler did) and mentions that West Germany conducted ballistics tests.

Kershaw wrote that chapters 5–7 of Joachimsthaler's book were "the most reliable and detailed examination" of the burning of Hitler and Eva Braun's bodies. Contrary to the view held by some early historians of Hitler's death (supported by certain scientific studies) that bone withstands even indoor cremation, (Note: The verified dental remains include bone and charred muscle, with some breakage around the alveolar process and only partial burning (similar to the skull fragment debunked in 2009).) Joachimsthaler concluded that there would have been little more left of Hitler's body than "calcified bones that can easily disintegrate" subjected to intense artillery bombardment. On this basis, he argued (as U.S. jurist Michael Musmanno had done 45 years earlier) that the Soviets never found an intact body. Joachimsthaler dismissed an alleged Soviet autopsy report of Hitler's remains, correctly concluding that only his dental remains are known to have been found, (Note: In 2009, DNA analysis revealed that a skull fragment, long claimed by the Soviets to belong to Hitler, was actually that of a woman.) positing that the Soviets sifted these from the soil. (Note: Joachimsthaler implies that the Soviets may have falsified an alleged body double of Hitler because they failed to find the dictator's body, and arguing that Hitler never used political decoys in life.) Joachim Fest also concluded that only Hitler or Braun's dental remains were confirmed to have been found by the Soviets. Kershaw supported Joachimsthaler's conclusions regarding Hitler's manner of death and the scantiness of the remains (owing to their lengthy burning and the heavy bombardment of the area). In his review of the forensic evidence and eyewitness statements, de Boer also supported Joachimsthaler's conclusions regarding the limited remains as well as the fabricated nature of the alleged autopsy report.

Subsequent to the book's release, the 1947 account of Hitler's secretary Traudl Junge was published. (Note: Joachimsthaler questioned the reliability of some of Junge's statements.) Supporting accounts from that time cited by British historian Hugh Trevor-Roper, Junge claimed that Günsche said that Hitler shot himself through the mouth and that his "skull was shattered", while Joachimsthaler asserted that no one saw damage to the back of Hitler's head. In his 2019 book, English historian Luke Daly-Groves regards Joachimsthaler's account as "incomplete", largely because he lacked access to British intelligence files, some first analyzed by Daly-Groves. However, Daly-Groves praises Joachimsthaler's methodology of returning to primary sources to "regain perspectives on official conclusions", but suggests that review of closed files of MI6 intelligence regarding its choice to investigate rumours of Hitler's escape could be useful in disproving such claims. Daly-Groves agrees with Joachimsthaler's conclusions that Hitler died by suicide in Berlin and that his corpse was burnt to near-ashes. Daly-Groves argues that while the evidence implied a suicide by gunshot, it should not be considered the "definitive answer", citing Fest's 2002 argument that eyewitness discrepancies had rendered Hitler's death "impossible to reconstruct". Forensics expert Philippe Charlier, who analyzed the dental remains, concluded that the bodies were not completely burnt due to their water content, as forensicist Mark Benecke opined in 2003. In 2023, English historian Mark Felton surmised that (after botching the couple's cremations) the Germans must have expertly concealed the bodies and planted the dental remains on similar corpses, with the Soviets later propagandizing their findings.

== Publications ==
=== In German ===
==== As author ====
- Entwicklungsgeschichte der elektrischen Lokomotiven ("History of development of electric locomotives") in 100 Jahre elektrische Eisenbahn ("100 years of electric railway"). Starnberg: Keller Verlag, 1980, ISBN 3-7808-0125-6, Page 22ff.
- Bundesbahn-Ausbesserungswerk München-Freimann. Geschichte, Menschen, Fahrzeuge 1925–1985 ("Munich-Freimann Federal Railroad Repair Center. History, people, vehicles 1925-1985"). Munchen: Bundesbahn-Ausbesserungswerk München-Freimann,1985.
- Die Breitspurbahn: Das Projekt zur Erschließung des groß-europäischen Raumes 1942–1945 ("The Broad railway: The project for the development of the Greater European region 1942-1945"). München: Verlag Herbig, 1985. ISBN 3-7766-1352-1.
- Korrektur einer Biografie. Adolf Hitler 1908–1920 ("Correction of a biography. Adolf Hitler 1908-1920"). München: Verlag Herbig, 1989. ISBN 3776615753
- Hitlers Ende ("Hitler's end"). Augsburg: Bechtermünz Verl. 1995.
- Hitlers Weg begann in München. 1913–1923 ("Hitler's path began in Munich. 1913-1923"). München: Verlag Herbig, 2000, ISBN 3-7766-2155-9 (überarbeitete Fassung von „Korrektur einer Biografie“; Foreword by Ian Kershaw).
- Hitlers Liste. Ein Dokument persönlicher Beziehungen ("Hitler's list. A document of personal relationships"). München, Verlag Harbig, 2003. ISBN 3776623284
- München – Hauptstadt der Bewegung ("Munich - capital of the movement"). München
  - Catalog of the Munich city museum

==== As publisher ====
- Christa Schroeder: Er war mein Chef ("He was my boss"). Munich 1985
  - Memoirs of one of Hitler's secretaries

=== In English ===
- Joachimsthaler, Anton (1999) [1995]. The Last Days of Hitler: The Legends, The Evidence, The Truth. Brockhampton Press. ISBN 1-86019-902-X.

== Bibliography ==
- Charlier, Philippe; Weil, Raphael; Rainsard, P.; Poupon, Joël; Brisard, J.C. (1 May 2018). "The remains of Adolf Hitler: A biomedical analysis and definitive identification". European Journal of Internal Medicine. 54: e10–e12. doi:10.1016/j.ejim.2018.05.014. PMID 29779904. S2CID 29159362.
- Daly-Groves, Luke (2019). Hitler's Death: The Case Against Conspiracy. Oxford, UK: Osprey. ISBN 978-1-4728-3454-6.
- de Boer, Sjoerd (2022). The Hitler Myths: Exposing the Truth Behind the Stories about the Führer. Frontline Books. ISBN 978-1-39901-905-7.
- Evans, Richard (2020). The Hitler Conspiracies. London: Oxford University Press. ISBN 978-0190083052.
- Fest, Joachim (2004). Inside Hitler's Bunker: The Last Days of the Third Reich. New York: Farrar, Straus and Giroux. ISBN 978-0-374-13577-5.
- Kershaw, Ian (2001) [2000]. Hitler, 1936–1945: Nemesis. New York; London: W. W. Norton & Company. ISBN 978-0-393-32252-1.
- Kershaw, Ian (2008). Hitler: A Biography. New York: W. W. Norton & Company. ISBN 978-0-393-06757-6.
