= The Strange Death of Adolf Hitler =

1939 book alleging Hitler died in 1938

The Strange Death of Adolf Hitler is an anonymously written 1939 book which claims that Adolf Hitler died in 1938 and was subsequently impersonated by look-alikes including the author.

According to the book, the author was born Maximilian Bauer. He claims he was arrested by German police in 1933; subsequently, the Nazi Party came into power and retained him and three others as possible doubles for Hitler. The author claims that on the night before the Munich Agreement (signed 30 September 1938), he dined with Hitler and other high-ranking Nazi officials when the Führer was poisoned via a South American drug. The remaining Nazi leaders quickly decided to maintain the illusion that Hitler was in charge by using the look-alikes as puppet rulers. The book concludes with the author asking Joseph Goebbels for a female concubine and contemplating suicide by gunshot.

An introductory publisher's statement claims that the manuscript's sources were "unimpeachable". An unnamed German officer who was not sympathetic to the Nazis allegedly delivered the manuscript. The publisher thought its claims resembled a satirical account that had been published earlier that year in The New Yorker, but the officer insisted that his claim was genuine. He said he had obtained the German manuscript in Nice from an employee of the French Line and subsequently decided to translate it into English. He was convinced of the manuscript's authenticity.

Foreign Affairs wrote that the book was a "fantastic, though elaborately circumstantial, yarn" which is "exciting reading for those who like to have their leg pulled."

== See also ==
- Conspiracy theories about Adolf Hitler's death
- Death of Adolf Hitler
