= Luke Daly-Groves =

English historian

Luke Daly-Groves FRHistS is an English historian and author who wrote the 2019 book Hitler's Death: The Case Against Conspiracy. He has lectured at the University of Manchester and the University of Central Lancashire.

== Early life ==
Daly-Groves attended Deyes High School in Maghull, Sefton, near Liverpool. Aside from his academic education, he was a keen partaker in the school’s extracurricular music activities, including several performances at the school’s various student concerts. Daly-Groves went on to graduate with a Bachelor of Arts (BA) in History from the University of Central Lancashire in 2015 and received the Sydney Lee Prize. He went on to complete a Master of Arts (MA) and a PhD at the University of Leeds.

== Hitler's Death (2019) ==
Daly-Groves became fascinated with Hitler's death during his teenage years, eventually leading to his 2015 dissertation, providing the basis of his 2019 book, Hitler's Death: The Case Against Conspiracy. It sets out to re-affirm that Hitler died in 1945 and refute claims of his surviving the end of World War II in Europe. Daly-Groves cites recently declassified British intelligence documents, which demonstrate that Hugh Trevor-Roper did not work in isolation in coming to the initial British conclusion that Hitler indeed died on 30 April 1945. (Note: Daly-Groves notes that National Archives material related to MI6 activities in Germany in 1945 remains classified.) Daly-Groves takes a similar viewpoint as Michael Musmanno, Anton Joachimsthaler, Ian Kershaw, and Joachim Fest that Hitler's body was not discovered due to either being burnt to near ashes or (in Joachimsthaler's words) "fragile, calcified bones that can easily disintegrate". (Contrarily, Trevor-Roper and Alan Bullock argue, in line with certain scientific studies, that bone remains intact even after closed cremation.) Thus, Daly-Groves et al. hold that an alleged Soviet autopsy (published in a 1968 propaganda book) of Hitler's remains was fraudulent, with only his dental remains known to have been found. Daly-Groves' book includes cleaned, high-resolution scans of the Soviet photographs purporting to show Hitler and Braun's burnt corpses.

Daly-Groves also acknowledges 2009 DNA analysis which revealed that a skull fragment with gunshot damage, long claimed by Russian officials to belong to Hitler, actually belonged to a woman. Further, Daly-Groves argues in favor of debunking conspiracy theories via objective analysis as opposed to dismissing their specific claims outright, saying the latter approach has weakened refutations of such theories, some of which cite exceptional documentary evidence.

The book includes novelly published diagrams showing where Reichssicherheitsdienst (RSD) guard Hermann Karnau claimed he saw Hitler's remains buried in the Reich Chancellery garden, adjacent to the bunker itself, as well a diagram based on the testimony of RSD guard Erich Mansfeld, who said he was in the guard tower when he saw two bodies burning several metres to the north-northwest and that he thought the bodies were later buried in a bomb crater a few metres further northwest. (Note: Though not drawn by him, the diagram based on Mansfeld's statements visualises the bunker exit almost as far west as Hermann-Göring-Straße, omitting a large park between those two areas.) Daly-Groves claims Karnau's map "closely matches" Soviet diagrams (Note: One of these was a photograph SS-Rottenführer Harry Mengershausen used to specify the burning and burials sites to the Soviets, which is close to the location given by Mansfeld.) and cites a diagram by Chancellery guard Hilco Poppen which he says supports Karnau's scheme; (Note: Poppen's diagram vaguely relates a burial several metres to the northwest of the burning site (in fact agreeing with Mansfeld), but disregarding any locational reference to the bunker grounds.) however, both uniquely lack specificity as to the Chancellery layout, with Karnau also omitting the burning site. (Note: Karnau made numerous contradictory statements as to the burnings, including the date (saying it occurred on 1 May) and time, as well as the various states in which he ostensibly saw the remains.) (Note: Mansfeld and Poppen record Hitler and Braun's burning site as slightly to the southeast of their alleged burial location. A Soviet map of 13 May 1945 agrees with this and also shows where Joseph and Magda Goebbels's bodies were burned (almost centrally between the two aforementioned sites).) In 1945, an excavation team led by United States intelligence officer William F. Heimlich referenced Karnau's "rather sketchy map" in an unsuccessful hunt for evidence of Hitler's remains. Citing declassified U.S. Army intelligence files, Daly-Groves points that some information about investigations of Hitler's death was withheld from Heimlich "because higher-ranking American intelligence officers were aware that he was attempting to capitalise on sensational rumours" of Hitler's survival.

Daly-Groves notes that Soviet leader Joseph Stalin's motivations in claiming Hitler's survival remain unclear, with most commentators asserting that he intended to secure disputed areas of West Germany on the basis that they would be safer under Soviet control if, somehow, Hitler returned. Alternatively, Stalin may have wished to override political underlings such as Marshal Georgy Zhukov (who had said that Hitler was dead) or motivate his totalitarian Communist forces, with the possibility of even leveraging attacks on nations ostensibly harboring Hitler. (Note: Historian Mark Felton later opined that Stalin seemed to believe that Hitler escaped, with the primary fraud being conducted by the Germans, despite related Soviet reports being muddled with propaganda.) Daly-Groves concludes that the 2009 DNA analysis (showing the skull fragment to be from a female) supports the interpretation that the Soviets were unhappy with the quality of their investigations. He opined that documentation likely remained unexplored in both the Stalin secretariat files and the British National Archives that could clarify investigations of past survival rumours and provide further evidence to disprove Hitler's escape. He also argues that known documents demonstrate that Western powers could not have staged a cover-up regarding purported knowledge of Hitler's alleged survival. Daly-Groves suggests that although the evidence points to Hitler having shot himself, it should not be considered the "definitive answer", citing Fest's 2002 argument that eyewitness discrepancies had rendered Hitler's death "impossible to reconstruct". However, Daly-Groves declares that a death by some kind of gunshot no longer carries "ideological baggage" and states his hope that his book would lay to rest various conspiracy theories, especially those surfacing since 2009.

== The British and American Intelligence Divisions (2024) ==
Daly-Groves' research into Hitler's death and the organisations involved with investigating it inspired his PhD thesis, which evolved into his second book, The British and American Intelligence Divisions in Occupied Germany, 1945–1955: A Secret System of Rule. The book provides the first detailed history of the British and American Intelligence Divisions (IDs), examining how they functioned to secure the occupation and enforce political objectives in Germany. Daly-Groves argues that these intelligence organisations imposed a previously unrecognised 'secret system of rule' that acted as the true backbone of the Western Allied occupation, through complex military, scientific, security, political, and state-building functions. He contends that historians have previously overlooked the IDs because academic focus has heavily prioritised enduring organisations like the CIA, MI5, and MI6. The book was reviewed favourably in academic publications within the field of intelligence studies. Professor Christopher Moran described the work as a 'first-class contribution' that 'oozes quality' empirically and ideationally. A review published by the German Historical Institute London also praised the book for bringing forward a 'wealth of exciting findings' and demonstrating that the history of the twentieth century remains incomplete without considering the role of secret intelligence. Reviewing the monograph for Sehepunkte, German historian Matthias Uhl described it as 'a study rich in material and analytically ambitious, which makes an important contribution to the study of the Western Allied occupation policy and the early history of the Federal Republic'.
