= Contact shot =

Type of gunshot wound

A contact shot is a gunshot wound incurred while the muzzle of the firearm is in direct contact with the body at the moment of discharge. Contact shots are often the result of close-range gunfights, suicide, or execution.

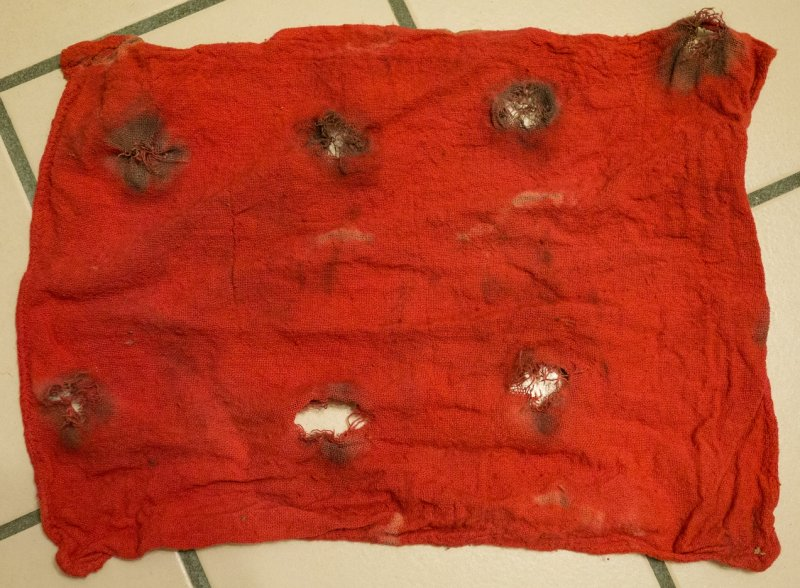
Effects of a contact shot from a .38 Special caliber gun on a folded cloth. Gunshot residue is visible as dark marks around the tears in the fabric.

== Terminal effects ==
Wounds caused by contact shots are devastating, as the body absorbs the entire discharge of the cartridge, not just the projectile. In this case the injection of rapidly expanding propellant gasses may cause significantly more damage than the bullet itself. Even a blank cartridge can very easily cause lethal wounds if fired in contact with the body, so powerheads, which are intended to fire at contact range, are still very effective when loaded with blanks, while being relatively safe if accidentally discharged from a distance.

Firearms such as muzzleloaders and shotguns often have additional materials in the shot, such as a patch or wadding. While they are generally too lightweight to penetrate at longer ranges, they will penetrate in a contact shot. Since these are often made of porous materials such as cloth and cardboard, there is a significantly elevated risk of infection from the wound.

== Characteristics ==
In the field of forensic ballistics, the characteristics of a contact shot are often an important part of recreating a shooting. A contact shot produces a distinctive wound, with extensive tissue damage from the burning propellant. Unlike a shot from point-blank range, the powder burns will cover a very small area right around the entry wound; often there will be a distinct pattern, called tattooing. Star-shaped tattooing is often caused by the rifling in the gun barrel, and distinct patterns may also be made by flash suppressors or muzzle brakes. The shape of the tattooing may help identify the firearm used.

In many cases, the body's absorption of the muzzle blast will act as a silencer, trapping the propellant gases under the skin and muffling the sound of the shot.

== See also ==
- Captive bolt pistol, a device designed to stun livestock with contact shots
