= Isaac McLellan =

American poet (1806–1899)

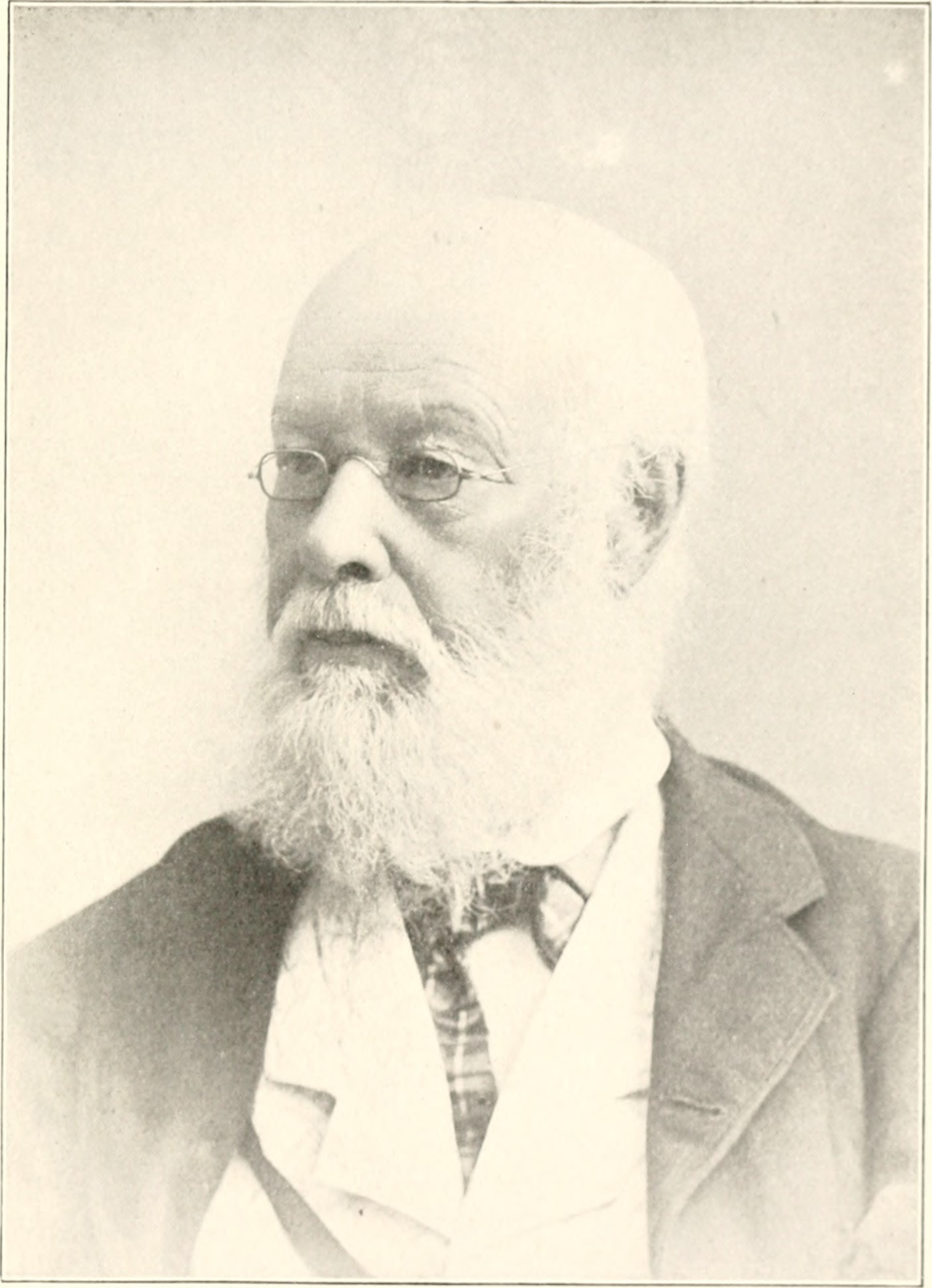
- Born: May 21, 1806; Portland, Maine, US
- Died: August 20, 1899 (aged 93); Greenport, Long Island, US
- Occupation: Poet

Isaac McLellan (May 21, 1806 – August 20, 1899) was an American author and poet, some of whose work has achieved notability through publication in anthologies.

== Biography ==
Isaac McLellan was born on May 21, 1806, in Portland, Maine, the home town of his lifelong friends, Henry Wadsworth Longfellow and Nathaniel Parker Willis.

In early life, his father, Isaac McLellan, moved to Boston, where for many years he was a prominent merchant, distinguished for his integrity and success in business. Willis' parents also moved to Boston, and Willis and McLellan were schooled together at Phillips Academy, Andover, Massachusetts. McLellan went on to Bowdoin College, where he was in the next class to Longfellow, Nathaniel Hawthorne, Cheever, and other distinguished writers.

=== Boston life ===
In 1826, he returned to Boston, completed a course of legal study, and was admitted to practice in the courts of that city. But literature had more charms for him than clients and briefs, and for many years he contributed, both in prose and poetry, to several magazines and papers published in the city and vicinity, and had the editorial management of two or three of them, including the Daily Patriot, the Daily Advertiser and the Weekly Pearl, formerly published by Isaac Pray. McLellan was in almost daily intercourse with Willis, at that time editor of the Boston Monthly Magazine, which took his contributions, as did the New England Magazine. In this period he wrote three well received volumes of poems, which were published by Allen & Ticknor, Boston. Only one poem in the collection The Trout Brook, was on a sporting theme, and was picked out for notice by the editor of Slackwood's Magazine.

=== The sporting life and Europe ===
Yet before literature, and throughout McLelland's life, he had a passion for the gun and the rod which led him to devote the major portion of his later life to the sports of the field and the flood. During college days, he would hunt on Saturdays with a fellow student. His leisure time in Boston was dedicated to the sport of wild-fowl shooting upon the seacoast - this being the principal pastime of many New England sportsmen.

About the year 1840, he went abroad, and passed some two years in Europe. While there he shot and fished in many portions of the continent, and thus added to his critical observation of American game and shooting a practical knowledge of the field-sports of Europe. On his return, be gave a description of his travels in a series of letters published in the Boston Daily Courier.

For two years after his return he engaged in agricultural pursuits and the rural life. His passionate love for field-sports, and more especially wild fowl shooting, inspired him to write in prose and verse on sporting subjects; for this work, Willis and other distinguished writers have given McLellan the credit of being in several respects the finest poet in America. Genio C. Scott, who wrote on fly fishing, remarked that "McLellan is as a poet on field-sports what George Pope Morris was as a song-writer both unsurpassed in their way."

Among the shooting resorts he frequented were Cohasset, Plymouth, and Marshfield, Massachusetts, the latter being the rural home of the statesman, Daniel Webster. Through his courtesy, McLellan passed two seasons at Marshfield, dwelling at one of the farm houses belonging to Webster. Here he had an opportunity of seeing the sportsman almost daily, enjoying his usual labors and his rambles with rod or gun.

=== New York life ===
In about 1851 McLellan moved to New York City, and there formed the acquaintance of the sporting celebrities of the day, who congregated at the old Spirit of the Times office, where William T. Porter presided one of the best-known, and, at that time, the most popular of all the editorial fraternity in the city. Here he met and became friends with the sporting author Henry William Herbert.

During several years he passed a part of each season on the coast of Virginia and at Currituck Sound, North Carolina, where the water fowl were then very abundant. In later years he followed the sport of duck-shooting at the Shinnecock Inlet and Great South Bay, Long Island, where he has resided for some time, in close proximity to the finest resorts of wild-fowl.

While in Virginia he contributed a valuable sketch to his friend Genio C. Scott's Fishing in American Waters, and also supplied the poetical gems in that standard work. In later life he contributed occasionally to the sporting journals of the day - The Turf, Field and Farm, Forest and Stream, American Angler, etc., besides the Home Journal and other periodicals of high literary merit. His ardor for field-sports was unquenched by age. His closing years were spent at Greenport, Long Island. Here he died of exhaustion, due to old age, August 20, 1899, aged 93 years, 2 months, and 29 days. He never married.

=== Poetry ===
Many of his later poems, consisting of nearly two hundred pieces, are descriptive of the larger game of Africa and Europe and comprise a valuable fund of sporting lore. They were brought together and published as Poems of the Rod and Gun; or, Sports by Flood and Field in 1886, a publication compared to kindred English works such as"The Chase, by William Somervile, and William Watt's Remarks on Shooting.

Wendell Phillips held McLellan in high estimation; and various collectors of American poetry, such as Rufus Wilmot Griswold, Cheevers, Kettell, and others, all give his work a place in their pages.

== Works ==
McLellan's published works include:

- The Fall of the Indian (1830)
- The Year, and other Poems (1832)
- Mount Auburn, and other Poems (1843)
- The Avalanche and the destruction of the Willey Family (1846)
- Poems of the Rod and Gun; or, Sports by Flood and Field (1886)
