= George Wilkes =

American journalist and writer (1817–1885)

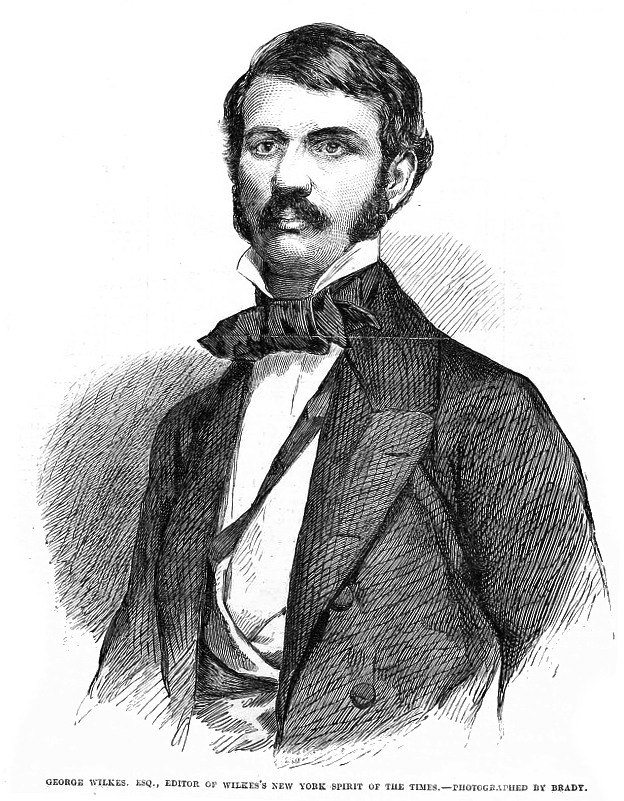
- Born: George Wilkes; 1817; New York
- Died: September 23, 1885 (aged 67–68)
- Occupations: Journalist and editor
- Children: Alicia, George

George Wilkes (1817 – September 23, 1885) was an American journalist and newspaper editor. A native of New York State, he became a journalist and, after losing a libel case, was imprisoned in New York City's jail; he wrote a pamphlet on the jail's conditions in 1844 based on his stay. The following year, Wilkes and a friend started publishing the National Police Gazette, a newspaper on crime reporting and other sensationalistic topics. In 1856, Wilkes bought a sporting newspaper called the Spirit of the Times, which he had previously worked for.

After selling the Gazette, he published and edited the Spirit until his death in 1885. Wilkes also wrote a couple of books on non-sporting topics and introduced pari-mutuel betting to the United States.

== Early life ==
Wilkes was born in 1817 in the state of New York in the United States. It is not certain who his parents were, although they may have been George Wilkes, a cabinet maker, and Helen. His family was likely of Irish origin, and he had a working-class background. Little is known of his upbringing before he became a law clerk for Enoch E. Camp. Wilkes left the legal profession for journalism, first working for a series of short-lived newspapers in New York City, the Flash, the Whip, and the Subterranean. At the Subterranean, he came into contact with Mike Walsh, a politician and working class advocate who shared Wilkes' Democratic Party politics. The scholar Donna Dennis says of Wilkes at this time that he was "a clever writer, with a temperament that was at once ambitious, adventurous, and entrepreneurial".

In August 1841, Wilkes joined forces with William Snelling and founded the Sunday Flash, where he wrote and edited under a pseudonym, "Startle". (Note: "Flash" in the slang of the time was a description of the style of men who frequented the brothels of the city. It was mostly used as an adjective with connotations of being phony or deceptive.) Among other topics, the Sunday Flash rated New York's brothels and published descriptions and reviews of them. In 1841 and 1842, Wilkes was one of a group of writers and publishers who were prosecuted and convicted of "publishing an obscene paper", for their depictions of prostitution in their newspapers. Wilkes had also been charged with libel, and he pled guilty and printed an apology to the person he was accused of libeling, but he chose to fight the obscenity charge, and went to trial in January 1842. This trial ended with one juror holding out for acquittal, so the prosecutor retried him in April 1842. This time Wilkes, on the advice of his attorney, pled guilty in return for a suspended sentence and a promise to stop working for the sensationalist press.

In 1843, Wilkes was brought before a judge for violating the previous agreement to stop working for "obscene papers". He had been covering the trial of Walsh as a reporter for Walsh's Subterranean and the district attorney claimed that this constituted a violation of his previous agreement. The judge sentenced him to a 30-day sentence, which was to be served in the city jail, the Tombs. He began his sentence in November 1843. After this stint, Wilkes wrote a pamphlet entitled The Mysteries of the Tombs: A Journal of Thirty Days Imprisonment in the N. Y. City Prison, which came out in 1844 and was based on his experiences in jail. Wilkes returned to the study of law after his stint in jail, and even called himself an attorney for a short time.

== Early writings ==
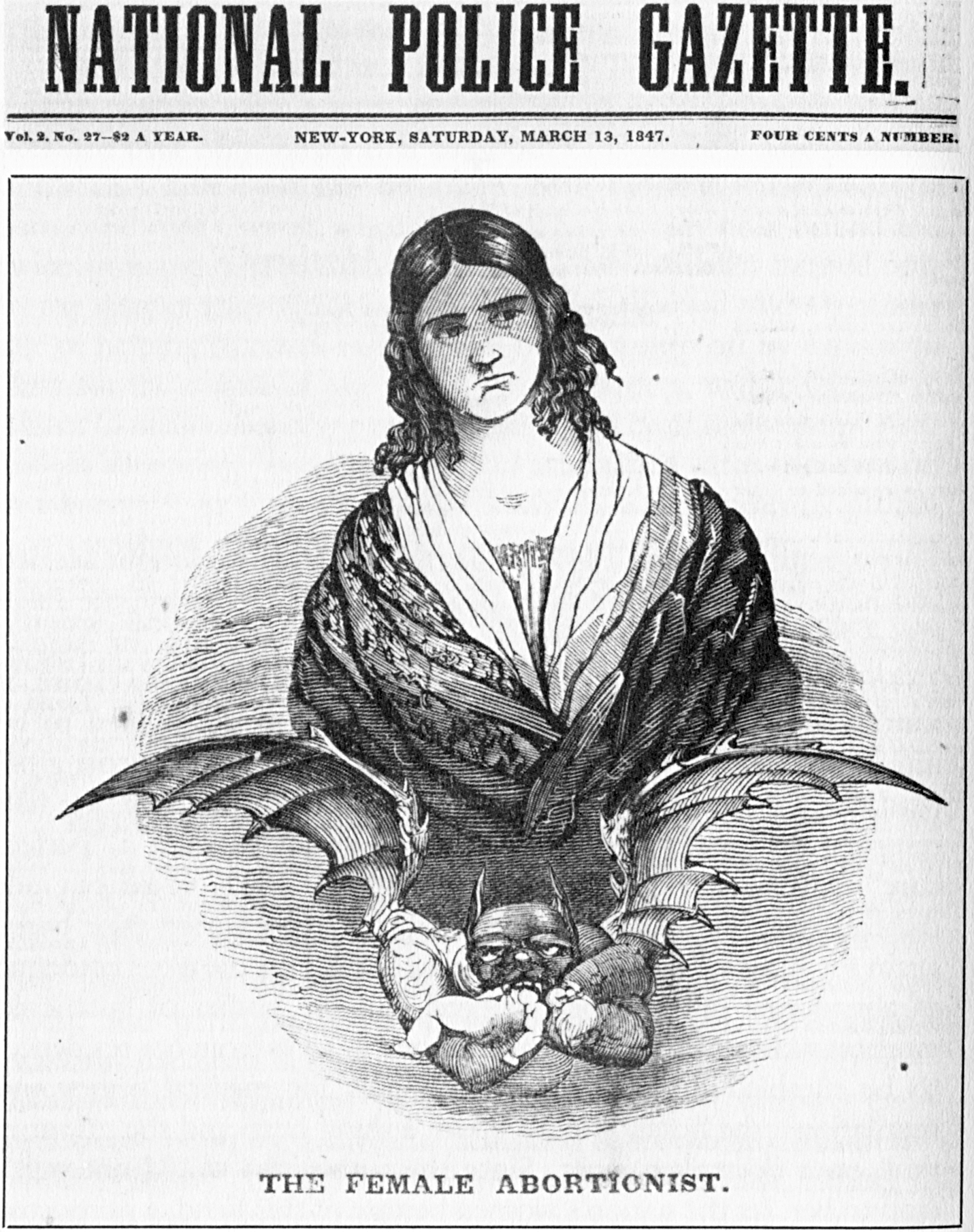
Cover of an 1847 issue of the National Police Gazette, while it was published by Wilkes

In 1845, Wilkes joined Camp and began the National Police Gazette. It quickly became popular and, within a few weeks, had a circulation of 15,000. Collier's called the Gazette a record of "horrid murders, outrageous robberies, bold forgeries, astounding burglaries, hideous rapes, vulgar seductions, and recent exploits of pickpockets and hotel thieves." Unlike the Sunday Flash, the Gazette focused its stories on criminals and the details of their crimes. Each issue ran a front page story detailing the life of some criminal, as part of a series titled "Lives of the Felons". Much of the appeal of the paper came from the sensationalist descriptions of the crimes and the woodcut illustrations of the crimes and felons. Because of Wilkes' and Camp's efforts to combat crime in New York through the Gazette, the offices of the newspaper were the subject of attacks by mobs stirred up by criminals.

Wilkes wrote a History of Oregon, Geographical and Political in 1845, which was inaccurate. Notwithstanding, an extract was published as Project for a National Railroad from the Atlantic to the Pacific Ocean, also in 1845. It was popular and was in its fourth edition by 1847. In 1848 and 1849, Wilkes wrote a novel, The Lives of Helen Jewett, and Richard P. Robinson, loosely based on the life and murder of Helen Jewett, a New York prostitute. The novel was first serialized in the Gazette before being published as a stand-alone work in 1849, titled The Lives of Helen Jewett and Richard P. Robinson. (Note: In 1849 Wilkes also published a pamphlet version of the trial transcript, titled The Trial of Richard P. Robinson, Before the Court of Oyer and Terminer on the 2nd of June, 1836, for the Murder of Ellen Jewett, on the Night of the 9th of April, 1836.) Although based on Jewett's life and death, there was much embellishment. It combined the facts of the case with elements from contemporary murder mysteries and seduction novels set in the growing cities of the time. Wilkes did have access to some of Jewett's letters, which had been held by the district attorney's office since Jewett's murder in 1836 and the subsequent trial. Wilkes, who obtained the letters in 1848, also acquired the hatchet that had been used to murder Jewett. The letters were eventually published in the Gazette and were even displayed, along with the murder weapon, in the newspaper's office window. (Note: The letters have since disappeared along with the hatchet. It's likely that Wilkes never returned them to the district attorney's office.)

Around 1849, Wilkes went to California, either with or shortly after his friend David Colbreth Broderick. (Note: The exact date of Wilkes' move to California is unclear. His entry in the Dictionary of American Biography states he moved in 1849. Donald E. Hargis, writing in the California Historical Society Quarterly, stated it was in 1850. Alexander Saxton stated it was 1852 in an article in the American Quarterly.) Wilkes was a political advisor of Broderick's, but they quarreled over water issues in 1853 and Wilkes left California. Wilkes then traveled to Europe, turning the experience into another book, this one entitled Europe in a Hurry. Returning to California after Europe, he reunited with Broderick in late 1853 but another quarrel in 1854 over Wilkes' appointment to a judicial post led to Wilkes' leaving California permanently. The two men reconciled in 1859 during a visit by Broderick to New York shortly before Broderick's death. Wilkes was the recipient of Broderick's estate, and Wilkes wrote a long eulogy to his friend that appeared in the Spirit in October 1859.

At some point, Wilkes and Camp sold the Gazette to George W. Matsell, who had previously been Chief of Police for New York City. The date when this occurred is unclear. The dates given in the sources range from in 1856, 1857, or as late as 1866.

In 1856, Wilkes briefly took part in William Walker's invasion and seizure of Nicaragua, the Filibuster War. Wilkes appears to have spent two months in Central America with Walker, but fled the country in April 1856 when Costa Rica invaded to oust Walker. Some likely reasons for Wilkes supporting Walker were the goal of spreading American ideals of equality and the need for land for further American expansion. Wilkes had been a member of the National Reform Association, which sought to provide land for the urban poor as a way of improving their conditions. Previously, he had tried to prevent the banning of Hispanics in the California gold fields and supported the distribution of land to non-whites. Wilkes' championing of Walker continued after he left Central America as he organized and took part in groups supporting Walker from New York City.

== Spirit of the Times ==
When Wilkes returned to New York City, he began to work for William T. Porter's newspaper Spirit of the Times. Porter sold the paper in 1856 to Wilkes, who retained Porter on the newspaper's staff until Porter's death in 1858. Wilkes, however, renamed the paper to Porter's Spirit of the Times, a title it retained until 1859. In September 1859, Abraham C. Dayton, who had previously worked for the Spirit, left the paper and because he had purchased a share of the paper at one point from Porter, began publishing a paper he called Porter's Spirit of the Times. Dayton got a court order preventing Wilkes from using Porter's name, so Wilkes changed the name of his paper to Wilkes' Spirit of the Times, while Dayton continued to publish Porter's Spirit of the Times. Dayton was only able to publish until August 1861, however, as Wilkes drove the other paper out of business. Wilkes owned the surviving paper until his death in 1885.

Under Wilkes' ownership, the Spirit, which previously had covered mainly sporting events, expanded its coverage to include political matters. When the American Civil War began in 1861, Wilkes also covered the battles. He was present at the First Battle of Bull Run, which he then narrated for the Spirit. He continued as a correspondent throughout the war, but during the war contracted the kidney disease, which later killed him. Wilkes was one of the first newspaper reporters to criticize General George McClellan, printing a series of articles in summer 1862 claiming that the general had pre-war ties, efforts to expand slavery, and was too sympathetic to Southerners. Wilkes also claimed that the general did not usually arrive at the battlefield until after the fighting was concluded, a behavior that conflicted with McClellan's jingoistic dispatches. His widely reprinted reports effectively tarnished McClellan's reputation, and it never recovered. The reports on McClellan were reprinted in pamphlet form, under the title McClellan: From Ball's Bluff to Antietam.

Wilkes also used literary feuds with other newspapers, both in and out of the sporting press, to help his subscription rates. After the Civil War, Wilkes' Spirit was one of the three leading newspapers in New York City. Two, including the Spirit, of the three were mainly devoted to horse racing – the other being The Turf, Field and Farm by Sanders D. Bruce.

== Later life ==
Wilkes was active in Republican Party political affairs and ran for the United States Congress against James Brooks, losing the race in 1870, with Brooks receiving 12,845 votes and Wilkes 7149 votes. Wilkes, along with John Chamberlain and Marcus Cicero Stanley, introduced pari-mutuel betting in the United States. Wilkes was also active in promoting boxing, acting as the promoter for some prizefights. Wilkes also became involved in an effort to colonize Baja California, becoming trustee of a colonizing company in 1867. In 1871 he went to Paris to cover the Paris Commune, many of the ideals of which he shared. In 1877 he published his last work, Shakespeare from an American Point of View, which reflected his lifelong interest in William Shakespeare. This work was revised twice, with the third edition appearing in 1882.

Married twice, Wilkes had two adopted children, George and Alicia. He also had a sister, Catherine, and a brother, Henry. He died on September 23, 1885, in New York City, and was buried on September 26, 1885. His heir was his daughter Alicia.

It is claimed that Tsar Alexander II of Russia in 1870 inducted him into the Order of St Stanislas for Wilkes' promotion of a railroad route from Russia through India to China. The writer of his Dictionary of American Biography entry described him as a "master of a vigorous style that exactly suited his hard truculent disposition". Patricia Cohen, author of a history of Helen Jewett's life and murder, described Wilkes' as having an "articulate wit and a talent for sarcastic social criticism".
