= C.C. Crews =

American physician

Charles Constantine Crews
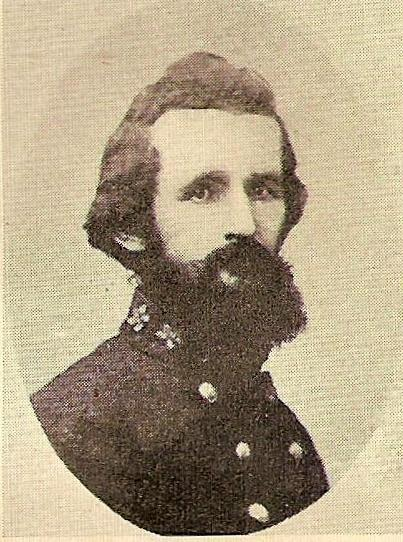
- Born: September 3, 1829; Upson County, Georgia, US
- Died: November 14, 1887 (aged 58); Hillsboro, New Mexico, US
- Military career
- Allegiance: Confederate States of America: Georgia
- Branch: Georgia Militia; Confederate States Army
- Service years: 1862-1865
- Rank: Colonel
- Commands: 2nd Georgia Cavalry; Crews' Cavalry Brigade
- Conflicts: American Civil War: First Battle of Murfreesboro; Battle of Dover (1863); Battle of Chickamauga; Knoxville Campaign; Atlanta campaign; Carolinas campaign
- Other work: physician, railroad executive

Charles Constantine Crews (September 3, 1829 – November 14, 1887) was an attorney, medical doctor, railroad executive and Confederate Colonel in the American Civil War. Between 1862 and 1865, he participated in most of the Western Theater cavalry campaigns of Major General Joseph Wheeler, initially leading the 2nd Georgia Cavalry and eventually a cavalry brigade.

== Early life ==
Born to Reuben Jordan Crews, a real estate attorney and colonel in the Georgia Militia, and Elizabeth Yarbrough Phillips Crews in Upson County, Georgia, Crews was the first of eight children. At the age of eighteen, Crews was authorized to practice law after reading the law with an established firm and undergoing an examination. In 1853, he attended The Medical College of Louisiana, the predecessor institution to Tulane University School of Medicine, with Dr. G.N. Phillips of Alabama as his preceptor. He graduated from Castleton Medical College in 1859.

== Civil War ==
C.C. Crews was appointed a Captain in the Confederate States Army in February 1862 and given responsibility for A Company of the 2nd Georgia Cavalry, which was recruited from Randolph and Calhoun counties. They were deployed in June to Chattanooga with the 8th Texas Cavalry as a brigade under the command of Nathan Bedford Forrest, participated in the First Battle of Murfreesboro, and operated as far north as Elizabethtown and Lebanon Junction, Kentucky in September. He was captured during one of these raids at Glasgow, Kentucky by Col. Sanders D. Bruce of the 20th Regiment Kentucky Volunteer Infantry on 1 October 1862, but was soon exchanged. By November, C.C. was elected Lt. Col. In January 1863, Col. C.C Crews received command of his own brigade, the Crews' Brigade (2nd, 3rd, 4th Georgia and the 7th Alabama), part of the cavalry corps under the command of Major General Joseph Wheeler. Wheeler and Forrest operated in the area of Fort Donelson and Dover, Tennessee in February during the Battle of Dover (1863), at which time Col. C.C. Crews' was wounded in the hip. Also wounded was C.C.'s younger brother, 1st Lt. Fleming Jordan Crews, second in command of Company A, 2nd Georgia, returning at the end of the year to command the company as a captain.

=== Chickamauga ===
During the Battle of Chickamauga, Col. C.C. Crews commanded the 1st Brigade (General John A. Wharton Division, Major General Wheeler Corps) consisting of the 2nd, 3rd and 4th Georgia Cavalry and Malone's Alabama Regiment. They captured Lookout Mountain, which earned Col. Wheeler, Morgan, Crews and Harrison a commendation in September 1863 from Major General Wheeler, "I tender my thanks for their zeal, energy and gallantry during the engagement". In October, Crews' Georgia Brigade helped participate in the capture of McMinnville, Tennessee, during Wheeler's October 1863 Raid.

=== Knoxville ===
In December 1863, Crews' Brigade, which consisted of the 1st, 2nd, 3rd, 4th and 6th Georgia (General John T. Morgan's Division, Major General William T. Martin's Cavalry Corps), was part of the Confederate forces under Lieutenant General James Longstreet in the Knoxville Campaign. They earned a citation for gallantry in the Battle of Mossy Creek by General Martin, "I have never witnessed greater gallantry than was displayed by Colonel Crews and the officers and men of the First, Second, Third and Sixth Georgia Cavalry...Col. C.C. Crews deserves mention for his skill and bravery".

=== Atlanta ===
With the start of the Atlanta campaign, Col. C.C. Crews commanded a regiment under General Alfred Iverson, Jr. (General Martin's Division, Major General Wheeler's Corps) in April 1864. Col. C.C. Crews personally received the surrender of the highest ranking Union officer of the war, Major General George Stoneman (future governor of California), during Stoneman's aborted attempt to free Union prisoners at Andersonville prison. A local newspaper at the time reported, "...a flag of truce was sent by Gen. Stoneman to Col. Crews, proposing an unconditional surrender of the whole of his command...Col. Crews received the flag, and ordered Stoneman's army to stack arms. Six hundred cavalry and two pieces of artillery immediately obeyed the order...". Also captured was Stoneman's aid, Myles Keogh, later a casualty of the Battle of the Little Bighorn. During Wheeler's Raid of 10 Aug.-10 Sept. 1864, Crews' Georgia Brigade participated in the Second Battle of Dalton, raids in middle Tennessee, and skirmishes in Florence, Alabama. More skirmishes continued in Alabama during the month of October. November 1864 found the Crews' Brigade around Macon fighting the Union's Col. Atkins' 2nd Brigade Cavalry. In December 1864, the Brigade participated in the Battle of Waynesboro, Georgia, part of Sherman's March to the Sea, which culminated in helping Lieutenant General William J. Hardee's evacuation of Savannah, Georgia. The year ended with this note from Major General Wheeler, "...Allen, Humes, Anderson, Dibrell, Hagen, Crews, Ashby, Harrison and Breckenridge and many other brave men whose gallantry you have so often witnessed are here still to guide and lead you in battles yet to be won..".

=== Carolinas ===
During the Carolinas campaign Col. C.C. Crews commanded his Crews' Brigade consisting of the 1st, 2nd, 3rd, 6th and 12th Georgia Cavalry (General William W. Allen's Division, Major General Wheeler's Corps) and was recommended to be promoted to Brigadier General at the beginning of 1865. In February 1865, C.C. operated in the area of Augusta, Georgia, the Upper Three Runs area of Aiken, South Carolina, and the Saluda River area of Columbia, South Carolina under orders of Major Generals D.H. Hill and Benjamin F. Cheatham. Col. Crews commanded cavalry in the area of Salisbury, North Carolina and High Point, North Carolina at the end of April under orders of General J.E. Johnston. Col. Charles C. Crews and Capt. Fleming Jordan Crews were paroled at Charlotte, North Carolina, on May 3, 1865, under terms agreed between General Joseph E. Johnston and Major General William Tecumseh Sherman on April 26, 1865. In a final message from Major General Wheeler to his Corps, he pointed out "...Colonels Crews, Cook and Pointer...are still disabled from wounds...", the second time C.C. Crews' was wounded in action, "...while most nobly carrying out my orders upon the field."

== Later life ==
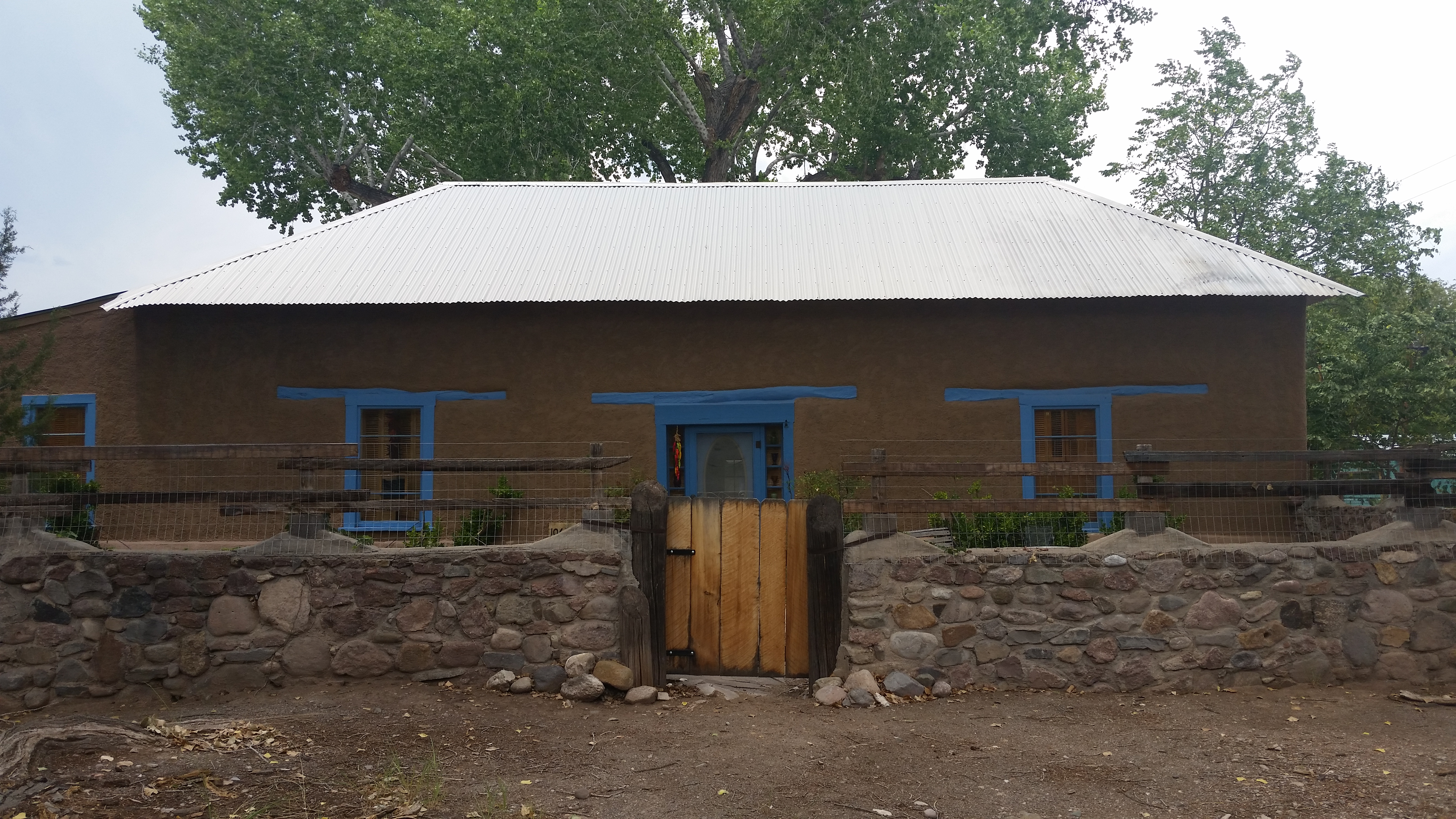
C.C. Crews house in Hillsboro, NM. His private practice was located in the front two rooms.

C.C. partnered with James John McDonald as a pharmacist in Cuthbert for five years before becoming the Treasurer of the Bainbridge, Cuthbert and Columbus Railroad Company. C.C. moved his family, his uncle Martin Mortimer Crews, his two brothers Dr. Leonidas Crews (New York University School of Medicine Class of 1855 and Assistant Surgeon CSA) and Fleming Jordan Crews, and their families to Texas in 1875. He then moved his family on to Hillsboro, New Mexico in 1879, where he practiced medicine until his death from pneumonia in 1887. C.C. Crews is buried in Hillsboro.

== Relations ==
C.C.'s younger brother, George Crews, served in the 35th Georgia Regiment (Edward L. Thomas commanding) from 1861 and fought in the Second Battle of Bull Run. Seven Days Battles and the Battle of Fredericksburg before dying in 1863 of pneumonia in General Hospital No. 17, Richmond, Virginia. Another younger brother of C.C.'s was Lt. Col. James Mortimer Crews, who commanded the Crews' Battalion (Col. Robert Trabue's 1st Brigade, General John C. Breckinridge's Reserve Corps), which fought in the Battle of Shiloh and earned a citation from Col. Trabue, "Lieutenant Colonel Crews behaved well".

After the battle, his battalion was consolidated into Company F, 9th Regiment Kentucky Infantry (Mounted) and Lt. Col. James M. Crews was discharged. He briefly became a POW (2–9 October 1862) of General James S. Negley's at Roseville, Kentucky, before becoming an Inspector General on General N.B. Forrest's staff in 1863. At the end of 1863, he took command of the 3rd Tennessee Cavalry (Forrest's) before being paroled 11 May 1865 in Gainesville, Alabama as part of the surrender of Richard Taylor to Major Gen. Edward Canby.
