= Middy Morgan =

Maria Morgan (November 22, 1828 - June 1, 1892), generally known as Middy Morgan, was an Irish-born agricultural journalist who became one of America's top livestock experts. At one time, she supervised the stables for King Victor Emmanuel II of Italy.

== Biography ==
Maria "Middy" Morgan was born in Cork, Ireland, the daughter of landowner Anthony Morgan. She became an expert equestrian early in life and studied cattle and horse breeding. When her father died in 1865, she went to Rome, Italy, accompanying her sister Jane, who intended to study art. After two years, she moved to Florence, where she was hired to supervise the stables of King Victor Emanuel II and select horses for his Horse Guards.

In 1869, she emigrated to the United States with letters of introduction to New-York Tribune editor Horace Greeley and New York Times editor Henry Jarvis Raymond. Her first published writing was a report for the Tribune on the horse races at Saratoga. Starting in the early 1870s, she was the livestock reporter for the New York Times for two decades. She also reported on livestock for periodicals such as New York Herald, Live-stock Reporter, American Agriculturist, Country Gentleman, Spirit of the Times, and The Turf, Field and Farm.

Morgan developed a reputation as one of the best judges of cattle in the United States After one trip to Europe on a cattle boat, Morgan wrote an exposé of the poor treatment of cattle on transatlantic crossings that led to improved conditions for the animals. One contemporary publication termed her "the most successful reporter among women", and Edward Page Mitchell, editor of the New York Sun, considered her the best woman reporter of the day.

Unable to find enough work on the east coast, Morgan went west for a few years in the early 1880s. She spent time in Montana, where a rancher who initially hired her as a ranch hand later took her into partnership, and she served as adviser to the Earl of Dunmore, who was planning to invest in ranching in Montana.

Returning east, Morgan lived for a time in Robinvale, New Jersey, where she was custodian of the Pennsylvania Railroad station, in exchange for which she received free rail transport for her reporting. She later moved to Staten Island to live with her sister Jane. Her death in 1892 was in part a consequence of a stockyard accident the year before.

Morgan bequeathed some of her valuables to the Metropolitan Museum of New York, including jewelry given to her by King Victor Emmanuel II.
