= General Stud Book =

Stub book for the British Thoroughbred horse breed

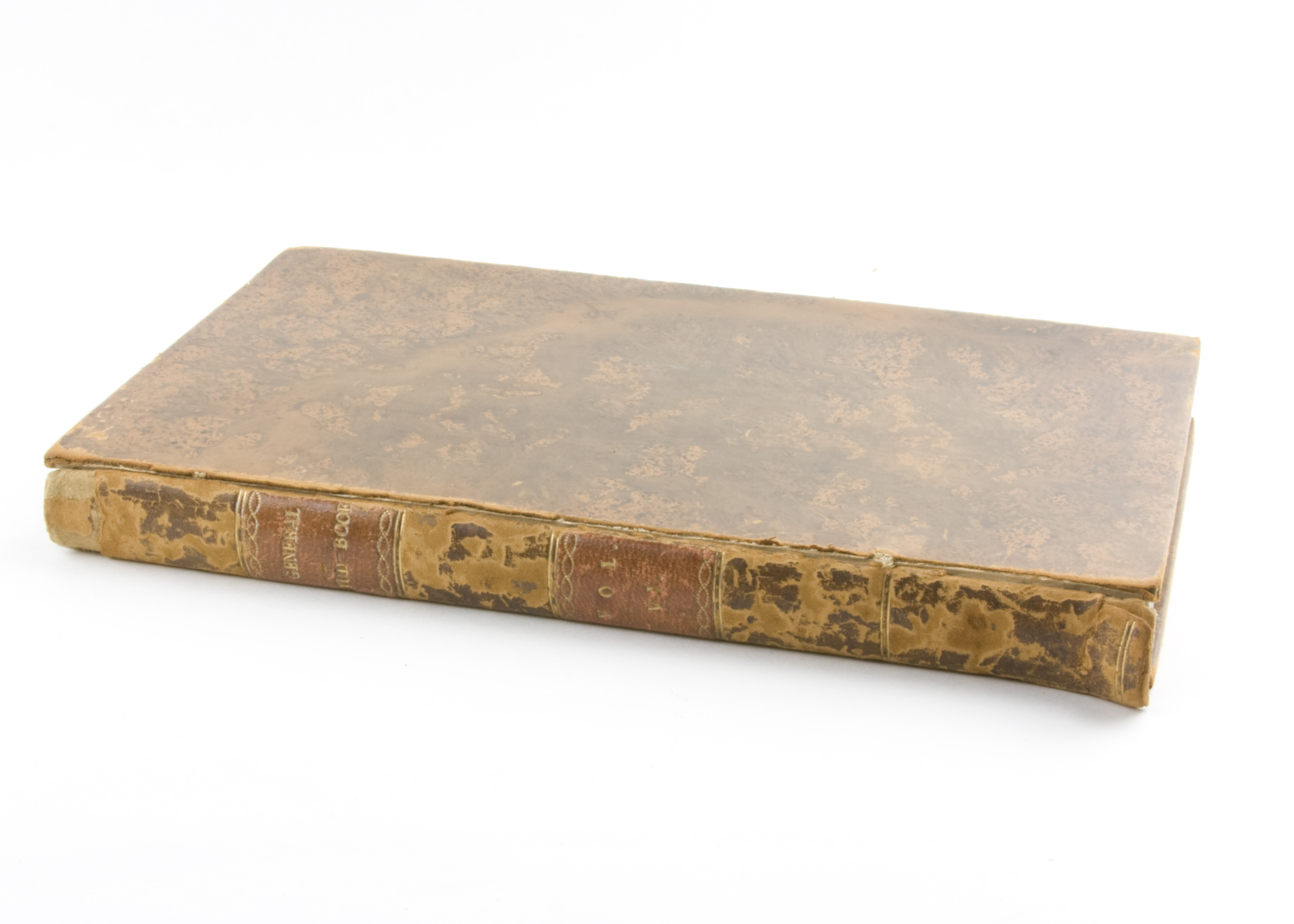
Volume Six of the General Stud Book published in London in 1857

The General Stud Book is a breed registry for horses in Great Britain and Ireland. More specifically it is used to document the breeding of Thoroughbreds and related foundation bloodstock such as the Arabian horse. Today it is published every four years by Weatherbys. Volume 49 was published in 2021.

In 1791, James Weatherby published Introduction to a General Stud Book, which was an attempt to collect pedigrees for the horses racing then and that had raced in the past. It was filled with errors and was not at all complete, but it was popular and led in 1793 to the first volume of the General Stud Book which had many more pedigrees and was more accurate. Volume one was revised many times, the most important being in 1803, 1808, 1827, 1859 and 1891.

The General Stud Book has been owned by Weatherbys ever since; the two horse racing authorities that cover the United Kingdom, the British Horseracing Authority in Great Britain (historically the Jockey Club) and Horse Racing Ireland for all of the island of Ireland, including Northern Ireland, do not maintain the registry. This differs from the American Stud Book which is owned by the United States Jockey Club.

== See also ==
- American Stud Book
- Australian Stud Book
