= Middy =

Middy may refer to:

- A middy blouse, an item of Sailor dress worn by girls and young women in the early twentieth century;
- The Mid-Suffolk Light Railway, an English railway company operating in the first half of the twentieth century;
- A half pint beer glass, a term used in certain states of Australia;
- A fictional character from the animated series Super Duper Bunny League.

== People with the forename ==
- Middy Morgan (1828-1892), Irish-born American livestock expert
