= George W. Matsell =

American police commissioner

George Washington Matsell (October 26, 1811 New York City – July 25, 1877 in Manhattan, New York) was the first New York City Police Commissioner.

== Biography ==
Matsell was born in New York City to George Joshua Matsell, an immigrant from Walsingham, Norfolk, England. He worked as an apprentice in his father's bookstore on Broadway during his childhood, eventually opening a bookstore of his own on Chatham Street after spending several years as a sailor. His bookstore was known for carrying the works of Freethinkers such as Thomas Paine, as well as spiritualists, attracting an educated clientele and making him prosperous. He married Ellen Miriam Barrett on April 6, 1834. He became a police magistrate in 1840. In later years his enemies claimed he was born in England, and immigrated at age 5-6; he claimed to be born in 1807.

Observing that the city had long since outgrown the outdated city guard system, Matsell began organizing regular night patrols throughout the city, especially along the New York riverfront, where they made several arrests and were successful in preventing criminal activities. Matsell's efforts would soon influence police reforms which would not only be adopted in New York with the passage of the Municipal Police Act in 1844, but throughout the United States as well.

Under the act, police departments were given a larger responsibility over the city and New York Mayor William Frederick Havemeyer would soon promote Matsell as police chief of the newly created New York City Police Department. Among the new reforms under Matsell's administration, patrol methods were improved and a strict discipline instilled, the results of which would be seen during the Astor Place Riots of 1849 and common violence seen during between Nativist and Tammany supporters during New York's political elections. Matsell would also seek to establish a special police division to patrol the city's river and waterfront areas, with property values at an estimated $350 million ($13.5 billion in present-day terms), to protect against the numerous river pirates of the period.

In 1857, the Metropolitan Police Act was passed by the state legislature in favor of the previous Municipal Police Act over a decade earlier and allowed the establishment of a police commission to oversee the New York's law enforcement. In the ensuing battle for control of the NYPD however, Matsell was forced to resign his position as the commission assumed administrative control. See New York City Police Riot. In 1859 he was the author of Vocabulum, or, The rogue's lexicon: compiled from the most authentic sources, a dictionary of American thieves' cant.

In 1866, George Wilkes and Enoch Camp sold the National Police Gazette to Matsell. (Note: Other sources state that Wilkes sold the Gazette shortly after his purchase of The Spirit of the Times in 1856, and that Matsell was the publisher of the Gazette through the American Civil War.)

Upon the reelection of Havemeyer in 1871, Matsell was again nominated for a position as superintendent of police. He was soon appointed as a police commissioner, and officially elected president of the board of police commissioners in July 1873. His return would only be a brief one as, with the defeat of Havemayer the following year, Matsell left along with him returning to the law firm which had previously established.

He died on July 25, 1877.

== Notes ==
Police appointments
Preceded by New office	Superintendent of the New York Municipal Police Department; 1845–1857	Succeeded by Office abolished
Preceded by James J. Kelso	Superintendent of the New York City Police Department; 1873–1874	Succeeded by George W. Walling
