= George Washington Harris =

American humorist (1814–1869)

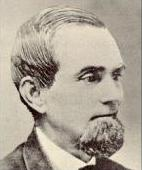
- Born: George Washington Harris; March 20, 1814; Allegheny City, Pennsylvania, USA
- Died: December 11, 1869 (aged 55); Knoxville, Tennessee, USA
- Resting place: Brock Cemetery; Wildwood, Georgia, USA
- Occupations: writer, riverboat captain, jeweler
- Spouse(s): Mary Emeline Nance; Jane Pride
- Writing career
- Pen name: "Mr. Free," "Sugartail"
- Genres: "Old Southwest" humor, political satire, local color
- Notable work: Sut Lovingood: Yarns Spun By a Nat'ral Born Durn'd Fool (1867)

George Washington Harris (March 20, 1814 – December 11, 1869) was an American humorist best known for his character "Sut Lovingood," an Appalachian backwoods reveler fond of telling tall tales. Harris was among the seminal writers of Southern humor, and has been called "the most original and gifted of the antebellum humorists." His work influenced authors such as Mark Twain, William Faulkner, and Flannery O'Connor.

Harris moved to Knoxville, Tennessee, as a child, where he worked variously as a silversmith, riverboat captain, and farmer. His earliest works were political satires published in the Knoxville Argus around 1840, and his earliest attributable works were four sporting stories published in the New York Spirit of the Times in 1843. He wrote his Sut Lovingood tales for various newspapers in the 1850s and 1860s, twenty-four of which he compiled and published as his only book, Sut Lovingood: Yarns Spun By a Nat'ral Born Durn'd Fool, in 1867. Harris died in Knoxville in 1869 after mysteriously falling ill on a train ride.

== Biography ==
=== Early life ===
The details of Harris's early life are obscure. His father, George Harris, and a companion, Samuel Bell, moved to Pennsylvania in the 1790s. Bell's son, also named Samuel, was born in 1798. After the elder Bell died, Harris married his widow, Margaret Glover Bell, and they gave birth to George Washington Harris in Allegheny City (now part of Pittsburgh) in 1814. In 1819, Harris's half-brother, the younger Samuel Bell, completed an apprenticeship at an arms factory and moved to Knoxville to open a jewelry store. Harris went with him and was apprenticed at the shop.

In 1826, a steamboat known as the Atlas became the first to reach Knoxville from the Mississippi River. Harris built a small model of the Atlas and dazzled an audience by sailing it across the so-called "Flag Pond" on the north side of town. At age 15, Harris rode horses in "quarter races" (i.e., races over a quarter of a mile) at tracks in the Knoxville vicinity. In 1835, he was hired as captain of the steamboat Knoxville. As captain of this vessel (later renamed the Indian Chief), Harris took part in the Cherokee removal in 1838.

=== Early writing career ===
In 1839, Harris left the steamboat business and purchased a farm near Maryville. Around 1840, he published his first political satires in the Knoxville Argus (later renamed the Standard), a Democratic-leaning newspaper edited by Elbridge Gerry Eastman (1813–1859), with whom Harris would form a lifelong partnership. Since articles in the Argus were typically published under generic pseudonyms, it is not known with certainty which articles Harris wrote.

By early 1843, Harris had moved back to Knoxville to operate a metalworking shop. That same year, he published four "Sporting Epistles," the earliest known works attributable to him, in the New York Spirit of the Times. In 1845, he published "The Knob Dance: A Tennessee Frolic," in response to a Mississippi writer who had derided East Tennessee as bland and overly obsessed with religion. Over the next two years, he wrote several more stories for the Spirit, culminating with, "There's Danger In Old Chairs" in 1847.

In the late 1840s, Harris turned to inventing and claimed to have prepared several articles for Scientific American, but no such articles have been found. Over the subsequent decade, he engaged in various enterprises, which included the founding of a glassworks and the cofounding of a sawmill, both of which apparently failed. He was elected an alderman for Knoxville in 1856 and appointed the city's postmaster the following year.

=== Later career ===
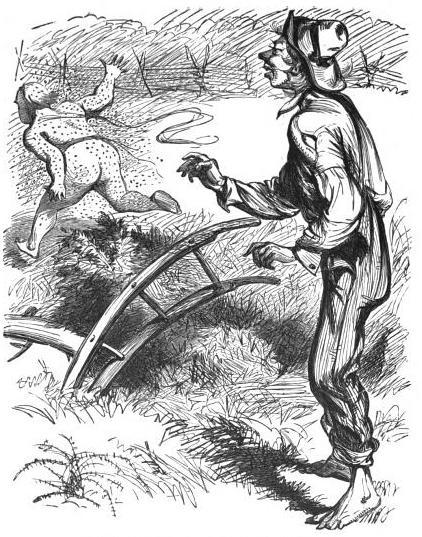
Sut Lovingood, as drawn in Harris's 1867 book, Sut Lovingood's Yarns

Around 1854, Harris surveyed several copper mines in the Ducktown area in southeast Tennessee. While working in the area, it is believed he met a local farmer, William "Sut" Miller (d. 1858), who inspired his best-known character, Sut Lovingood. In November 1854, Harris published his first Sut Lovingood tale, "Sut Lovingood's Daddy, Acting Horse," which would also be his last entry in the Spirit of the Times. For the remainder of the decade, his preferred outlet was the Nashville Union and American, edited by his old friend, Elbridge G. Eastman.

As the rift between the North and South widened in the years leading up the Civil War, Harris, an ardent Democrat and secessionist, moved to Nashville and began writing political satires in support of the South. These included his four-part story "Love-Feast of Varmints," which lampooned the Opposition Party's March 1859 Nashville convention, and three Sut Lovingood tales in 1861 that attacked President Abraham Lincoln. In early 1862, Harris fled Nashville ahead of invading Union forces and spent the remainder of the war evading the Union Army.

After the war, Harris, with the help of future Chattanooga congressman William Crutchfield, was appointed president of the Wills Valley Railroad (which operated in Georgia and Alabama). In 1866, he published "Sut Lovingood Come to Life," an attack on the Radical Republicans. The following year, he published his only book-length work, Sut Lovingood: Yarns Spun By a Nat'ral Born Durn'd Fool, which was a collection of twenty-four Sut Lovingood tales, sixteen of which had been published in various newspapers prior to the war.

=== Death ===
Following the success of Sut Lovingood Yarns, Harris made plans to publish a new collection of stories entitled High Times and Hard Times. In late November 1869, he travelled from his new home in Alabama to Lynchburg, Virginia, to show his manuscript to a prospective publisher. On December 11, while riding the train back to Alabama, Harris fell gravely ill somewhere near Bristol, Tennessee. When the train stopped in Knoxville, Harris, unconscious, was taken to the Atkin Hotel, which stood on North Gay Street.

At the Atkin, Harris was examined by a doctor, who issued a preliminary diagnosis of apoplexy. Later in the evening, four other doctors arrived, including Harris's brother-in-law, John Fouche. These doctors rejected the initial diagnosis and suggested a possible morphine overdose. Around 10:00 PM, Harris briefly regained consciousness and managed to say one final word: "poisoned". He died shortly afterward, with the official cause listed as "unknown." No copy of his manuscript High Times and Hard Times has ever been found.

== Writing ==
=== Early writings ===
Harris's earliest attributable works in the Spirit of the Times were four letters, or "epistles," to the Spirit's editor, William T. Porter. The first of these, entitled "Sporting Epistle from East Tennessee," was an account of a raccoon hunt in which the hunters mistook a bulge in a tree for a raccoon. The second involves a mountaineer who travels several miles to watch a quarter-race in south Knox County but misses the race due to drinking. The third epistle is a collection of anecdotes and observations, and mentions a 100-pound fish caught at Forks-of-the-River in east Knox County. The fourth epistle describes a country dance at "Tuck-a-lucky" (Tuckaleechee) Cove in south Blount County.

One of Harris's earliest successes was "A Snake-Bit Irishman," which appeared in the Spirit of the Times in 1846. The story involves several hunters in Morgan County who play a prank on an Irishman who had invited himself into their camp. The story relies on Irish stereotypes common at the time. In "A Sleep-Walking Incident," also published in 1846, Harris claimed to have once spent the night with a farm family in northeastern Tennessee, during which he sleep-walked his way into bed with the farmers' daughters. While the enraged farmer threatened to shoot Harris, he allowed him a brief headstart on his horse, and Harris managed to escape.

=== Sut Lovingood ===
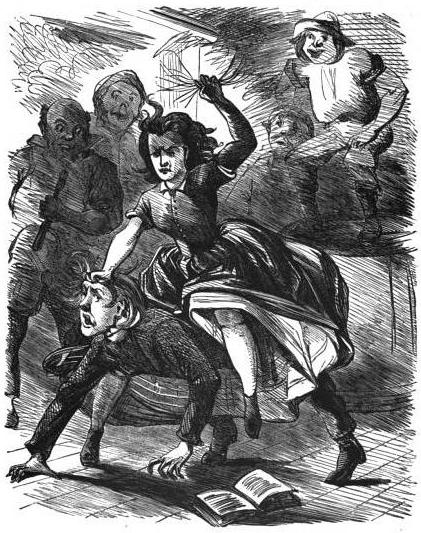
Women attack a "hard-shell preacher" who tries to break up a dance in Harris's "Bart Davis's Dance"

Sut Lovingood, Harris's best-known figure, is a caricature of a stereotypical farmer of rural Southern Appalachia. Knoxville historian Jack Neely describes Sut as "Huck Finn on amphetamines, a manic, perverse child of some backwoods holler where Idiocy and Genius fuse into one." Sut considers himself (somewhat proudly) to be a "durnder fool" than anyone, save his own father. He is fond of drinking whiskey and chasing girls, and relishes exposing hypocritical circuit riders and other religious figures and politicians.

Revenge pranks are a common theme in the Sut Lovingood tales. In "Parson John Bullen's Lizards," for instance, Parson Bullen, a fire-and-brimstone preacher, beats Sut with a club after catching him in the bushes with a girl at a camp meeting. Later, when Bullen is preaching to a large crowd, Sut releases several lizards, which crawl up Bullen's legs, prompting him to strip off his clothes in terror. Another target of Sut's revenge is Sicily Burns, a mountain woman who tricks Sut into drinking baking soda. In response, Sut causes a bull to wreak havoc at Sicily's wedding.

Sut's dialect is an exaggerated version of the South Midland dialect, commonly called "Appalachian English". Appalachian characteristics that frequently occur in Sut's speech include r-intrusion (e.g., "orter" for "ought to"), h-retention (e.g., "hit" instead of "it"), short "e" pronounced as short "o" (e.g., "whar" for "where"), and trailing t-intrusion (e.g., "onct" for "once").

=== Political satires ===
Harris was a strong Democrat, and his political writings either extolled Democratic leaders or lampooned leaders of opposing parties, namely the Whigs and Republicans. In his 1856 story, "Playing Old Sledge For the Presidency," Harris has Sut Lovingood recount a dream in which presidential candidates James Buchanan, Millard Fillmore, and John C. Frémont play a card game for the presidency. Harris's 1859 story "Love-Feast of Varmints" mocked the Opposition Party's state convention using anthropomorphic animals to portray party leaders such as John Bell, Henry S. Foote and Neill S. Brown.

In 1861, Harris published his three-part attack on Abraham Lincoln entitled "Sut Lovingood Travels With Old Abe as His Confidential Friend and Advisor." His first writings after the Civil War included "Sut Lovingood's Dream" and "On the Puritan Yankee," which defended Southern values. In 1868, Harris published "The Forthcoming Early Life of Sut Lovingood, By His Dad," which was a response to "The Early Life of Grant, By His Father," which had appeared in the New York Ledger earlier that year. One of Harris's last political stories, entitled "Well! Dad's Dead," was an allegory bemoaning the decline of the Southern way of life.

== Influence and legacy ==
Authors Mark Twain, William Faulkner, and Flannery O'Connor all acknowledged inspiration from George Washington Harris's work. In 1867, Mark Twain wrote a review of Sut Lovingood's Yarns for a San Francisco newspaper in which he suggested the book would "sell well in the west, but the eastern people will call it coarse and possibly taboo it." Faulkner read the Sut Lovingood yarns with "amused appreciation," and O'Connor ranked him among the top American "grotesque" writers. In the Cormac McCarthy novel, Suttree (which is set in Knoxville), the book's title character is called "Sut" for short, which some writers suggest is a reference to Sut Lovingood.

The mid-20th century brought revived interest in Harris's work. Literary historians compiled biographical materials regarding Harris's life, and scoured old newspapers to find and catalog Harris's work. In 1967, Thomas Inge published a collection of Harris's known works that did not appear in Sut Lovingood's Yarns in 1867. The book was entitled, High Times and Hard Times, after Harris's lost manuscript.

In 2008, George Washington Harris's final resting place was discovered in Brock Cemetery, Wildwood, Georgia. The literary/detective team was a group of scholars and writers from several states including Calhoun Community College faculty members located in Decatur, Alabama; a local historian from Decatur; and a writer based in Georgia. On April 20, 2008, a monument in his honor was erected at his burial site by Sigma Kappa Delta, an honor society for students studying English at two-year colleges.
