= Johnson J. Hooper =

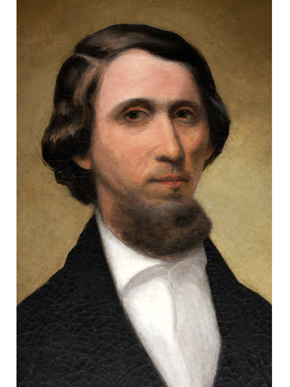
- Johnson Jones Hooper by unknown artist
- Born: June 9, 1815; Wilmington, North Carolina, U.S.
- Died: June 7, 1862 (aged 46); Richmond, Virginia, U.S.
- Resting place: Shockoe Hill Cemetery in Richmond, Virginia
- Occupations: Writer, editor, lawyer, politician
- Spouse: Mary Mildred Brantley
- Children: William - 1844; Annie - 1845, died in 1847; Adolphus - 1849
- Relatives: Archibald Maclaine Hooper (father); Charlotte DeBerniere (mother)

Johnson Jones Hooper (June 9, 1815 – June 7, 1862) was an American lawyer and writer from Alabama known for his humorist works set in what was then known as the Southwest of America, particularly the collection of stories published as Adventures of Captain Simon Suggs (1845). Hooper was known for pushing political agendas through his characters, as he satirizes everyday people's views, giving him the title as a realist author. This gained him a national reputation. A secessionist, he was appointed in 1861 as secretary of the Provisional Confederate Congress and moved to Richmond, Virginia with it before his death from tuberculosis.

== Biography ==
=== Early life ===
Hooper was born in Wilmington, North Carolina, as the youngest of six children to Archibald Maclaine Hooper and Charlotte (de Bernier) Hooper. Hooper’s father was the son of a prominent Episcopalian pastor and rector who began an early career in law, but then later moved to editorship, working Wilmington’s only newspaper at the time, The Cape Fear Recorder. Johnson’s mother, Charlotte DeBerniere, was the great-granddaughter of French Huguenot Jean Antoine D’Averhoult, who fled France after the Revocation of the Edict of Nantes. Archibald and Charlotte Hooper had six kids together: George, Maclaine, John, Louisa, Mary, and Johnson. Two of his older brothers, George and John, are the most notable within the resources that reference his family. At the age of 20, he moved to Dadeville, Alabama. There he edited a newspaper and practiced law, having been admitted to the bar after "reading the law". In 1838, Hooper passed the bar exam and began working in his brother’s practice. He then continued to take on the role as a census taker for Tallapoosa County. From this experience, and his observations of the rural Alabama population, he took much of the inspiration for his most notable works.

=== Education ===
Hooper had very little formal education and spent most of his time working with his father as a printer at his newspaper. His familial background was in the printing and editorial business. The Hooper family’s early prosperity allowed Johnson’s older brothers, George and John, to attend West Point and the University of North Carolina respectively. When Hooper was aged 11 to 17, he worked with his father as a printer's devil for a magazine titled Cape Fear Recorder. This gave him somewhat formal training for his later careers. Hooper’s father was fired from his work at the magazine in 1832, and the family faced unexpected financial difficulties. For this reason, they were no longer able to support a formal education for their youngest son Johnson. When Hooper was 20, he moved to LaFayette, Alabama and read law with his brother George and took the bar exam a few years later, all without formal education.

=== Personal life and death ===
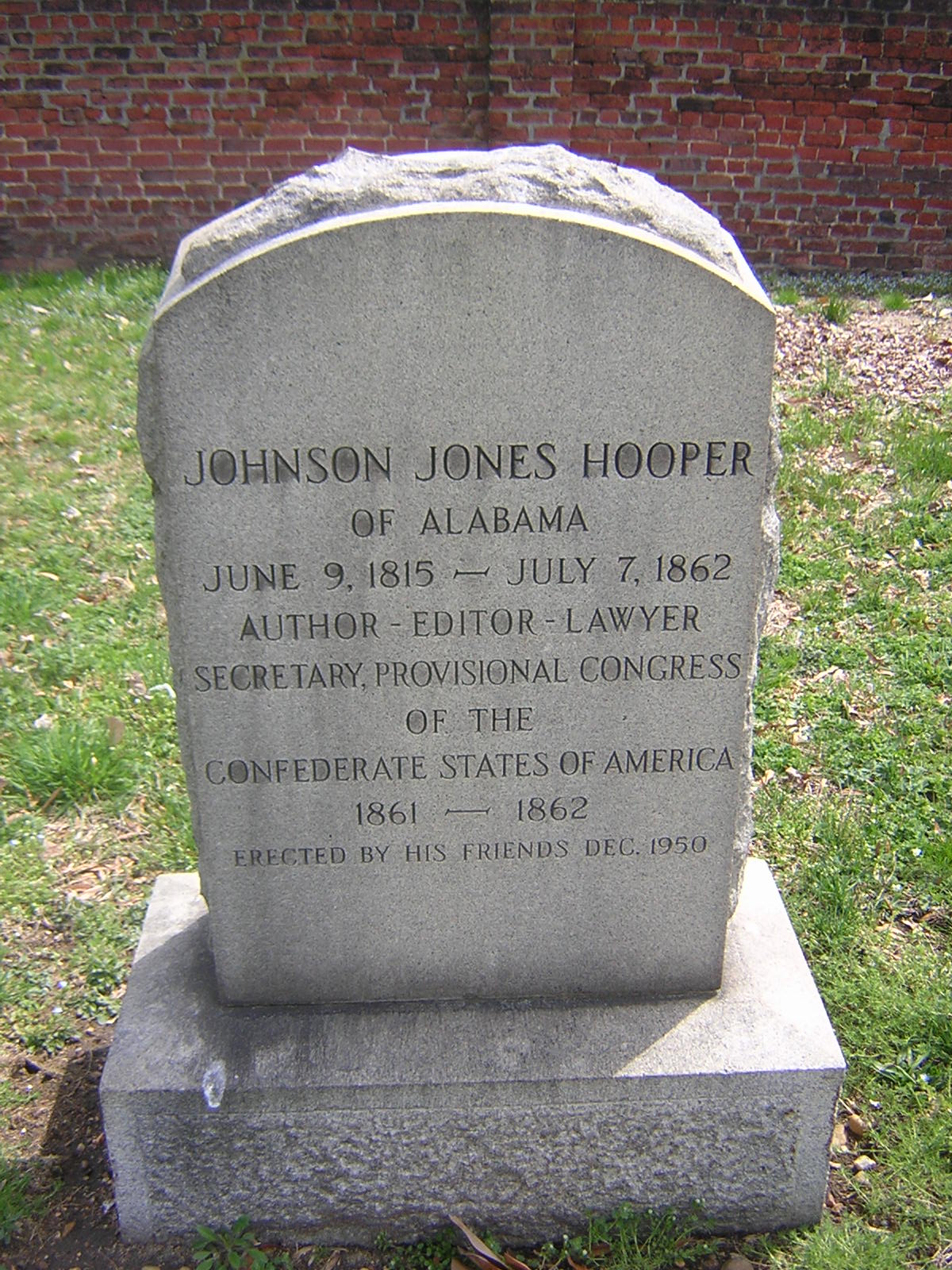
Marker of Hooper's grave

Hooper married Mary Mildred Brantley in 1845. They had two sons and a daughter, William (1844), Annie (1845), and Adolphus (1849). Annie died at age two, while the two boys lived into adulthood. Hooper joined the Catholic Church in 1861, the year before his death, caused by the effects of tuberculosis in 1862 (not 1861, as incorrectly indicated on the state historical marker). He was buried in that city's Shockoe Hill Cemetery. His grave was unmarked until 1950, when anonymous donors erected the current granite stone. He was a kinsman of William Mercer Green's wife Charlotte Isabella Fleming.

== Careers ==
=== Literary career ===
All told, he founded or edited six different publications during his career, along with his published literary works.The first evidence of Hooper’s writing is seen by the humorist poem Anthony Milan’s Launch, which he wrote around the age of 15, in 1830, while working with his father as a boy. In the summer of 1843, Johnson Jones Hooper published his first professional work “Taking the Census in Alabama” in The East Alabamian. This work was drawn from his own experiences as a census taker in Tallapoosa County. This story launched his personal career as a humorist, a theme and genre that is seen throughout each one of his works. By September 9, 1843, a journalist from New York, William T. Porter, a known writer, read and reprinted “Taking the Census in Alabama” in his Spirit of the Times newspaper, leading Hooper to his first taste of recognition as a writer. Separated into two parts, this story introduces Kit Kuncker, his second-most developed character, next to Simon Suggs.

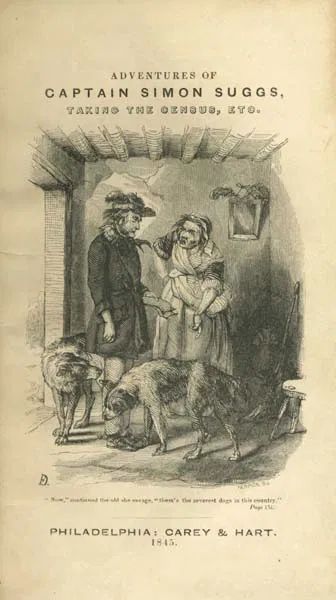
Some Adventures of Captain Simon Suggs

In 1844 he began publishing short stories about a character known as Simon Suggs, which he collected and published in 1845 as the Adventures of Captain Simon Suggs. It was broadly, cruelly, and uncouthly humorous, yet one of the raciest books of its time, descriptive of a gambling sharp of what was then referred to as the Southwest in the "flush times." The work made him nationally known, and may have inspired one or more characters by Mark Twain. While working as an editor for Carey & Hart on The Big Bear of Arkansas, Hooper was able to get himself signed to a contract that would print the first edition of 3,000 copies of what would become his most notable work. The collection of stories was combined under one title: Some Adventures of Captain Simon Suggs, Late of the Tallapoosa Volunteers: Together with “Taking the Census” and Other Alabama Sketches, which was published on July 30th 1845. In 1849 Hooper released another collection of short stories titled A Ride With Old Kit Kuncker, and Other Sketches, many of which also surrounded his beloved “Suggs” character. Hooper's Widow Rugby's Husband and Other Tales of Alabama in 1851 was less successful. Just six years before his death in 1862, Hooper published his last literary work titled Dog and Gun in 1856 as a combination of works originally written as a series but later combined into one book. This story combines the themes and genres from both of his most popular characters and works; Simon Suggs and Kit Kuncker. Dog and Gun’s success was widely attributed to his job at the Mail, announcing his work to the public in this forum. This was his final published work before the end of his life.

Throughout his life, Hooper also worked to edit several publications, newspapers, magazines, and novels, such as Woodward’s Reminiscences of the Creek or Muscogee Indians. In 1842 he began working as an editor at the East Alabamian, where his most notable works, including Simon Suggs, were published. For unknown reasons, during the summer of 1845, Hooper resigned from this position and moved to Wetumpka to accept a job as editor for The Wetumpka Whig. Just one year later, he moves to Montgomery to be an associate editor and co-owner of Alabama Journal. In 1849, he left Montgomery, Alabama to move to LaFayette to reopen his law practice while also taking an editorship role at the Chambers County Tribune. In 1854 Hooper returned to Alabama and co-founded The Montgomery Mail, considered an "independent paper."

=== Law career ===
In 1838, Johnson was sworn in as a public notary in Tallapoosa County after passing the bar earlier the same year without receiving any formal education for it. There and in Dadeville, he began to practice law before being asked to take the census of Tallapoosa County in 1840, influencing his first real successful literary work as mentioned in the section above. Also in Dadeville, Hooper opens a law practice in 1841 and goes into partnership with his brother George by the next year. However, this partnership only last for a short amount of time.

=== Political career ===
Intensely political, Hooper supported secession of Alabama and other slave states. He aligned with the Whig party in the government, and reflected his political views directly and satirically in all of his literature. In 1849, Hooper ran for the House of Representatives and lost, but in the same year was elected as solicitor of a judicial court. Four years later, he failed to be reelected. In 1861, he was appointed secretary of the Provisional Confederate Congress. He moved with the Confederate government to Richmond, Virginia, where he lost the bid for reelection to the same secretary position. He began a new job copying proceedings for the Provisional Confederate Congress.

== Legacy ==
=== Literary ===
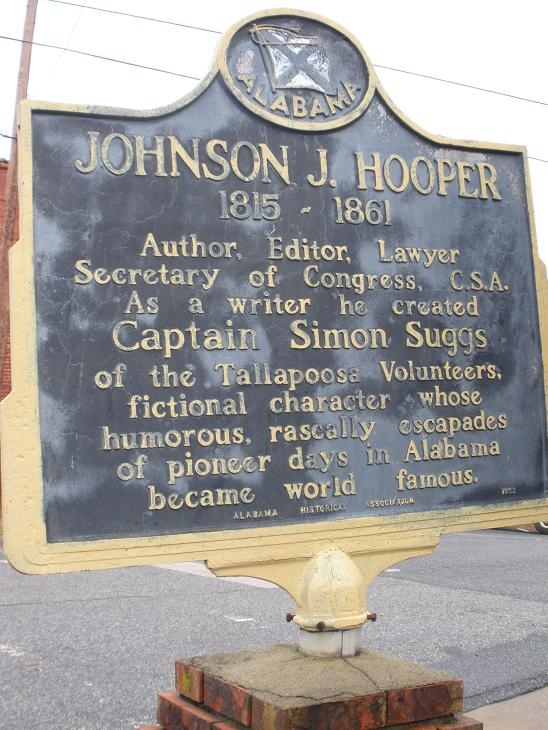
A historic marker in Dadeville, Alabama notes the significance of Hooper and his famous character Simon Suggs, a fictional native of Dadeville.

In the end, Hooper made a lasting impression as he is "remembered as one of the greatest Southwestern humorists of the nineteenth century, best known for Some Adventures of Captain Simon Suggs (1843). The characterizations of the "Old South" are notable within his works as he illustrated the Alabama backwoods and those that resided there. In addition, this was one of the first instances of the "humorous rogue and confident trickster archetype", all of this through his most famous character, Captain Simon Suggs. His humorist tone inspired other writers to follow in similar styles.

Thomas A. Burke dedicated his book of humorous tales, Polly Peablossom's Wedding (1854), to Hooper.

David Handlin ranked Some Adventures of Captain Simon Suggs as number 9 in his article "One Hundred Best American Novels, 1770 to 1985" (2014).

=== Political ===
Hooper's prevalent interest in politics allowed his works to be influenced by the political views and characterizations of the Southwest. As a result, his literary works set a precedent within politics as well. The military campaign biography was then utilized as an element of "Jacksonian machine politics". This type of biography allowed voters to define the characteristics and values of the running candidates for the voting public. This is one of the first examples of propaganda for the Confederate States of America. Johnson Hooper became known as the "Champion of the Creeks" because of his overwhelming empathy to the Creek Indians, whose land had been overrun by settlers on the frontier of western Alabama. He often spoke out against the speculators who had threatened the natives and cheated them of their rightful land.

== Works ==
- Anthony Milan’s Launch. Wilmington, North Carolina: Cape Fear Recorder, 1830. (Rpt. as Anthony Milan’s Launch. Chapel Hill: University of North Carolina Press, 1969; Tuscaloosa: University of Alabama Press, 1993).
- Taking the Census in Alabama. Philadelphia: Carey & Hart, 1845 (Rpt. as Taking the Census in Alabama. Chapel Hill: University of North Carolina Press, 1969; Tuscaloosa: University of Alabama Press, 1993).
- Some Adventures of Captain Simon Suggs, Late of the Tallapoosa Volunteers. Philadelphia: Carey & Hart, 1845 (Rpt. as Adventures of Captain Simon Suggs, Late of the Tallapoosa Volunteers. Chapel Hill: University of North Carolina Press, 1969; Tuscaloosa, University of Alabama Press, 1993).
- A Ride with Old Kit Kuncker, and Other Sketches, and Scenes of Alabama. Tuscaloosa: M. D. J. Slade, 1849 (Rpt. as The Widow Rugby's Husband. Philadelphia: A. Hart, 1851).
- Dog and Gun: A Few Loose Chapters on Shooting, Among Which Will Be Found Some Anecdotes and Incidents. New York: Orange Judd & Company, 1856 (Rpt. Tuscaloosa: University of Alabama Press, 1992).
