= Thomas Bangs Thorpe =

American painter

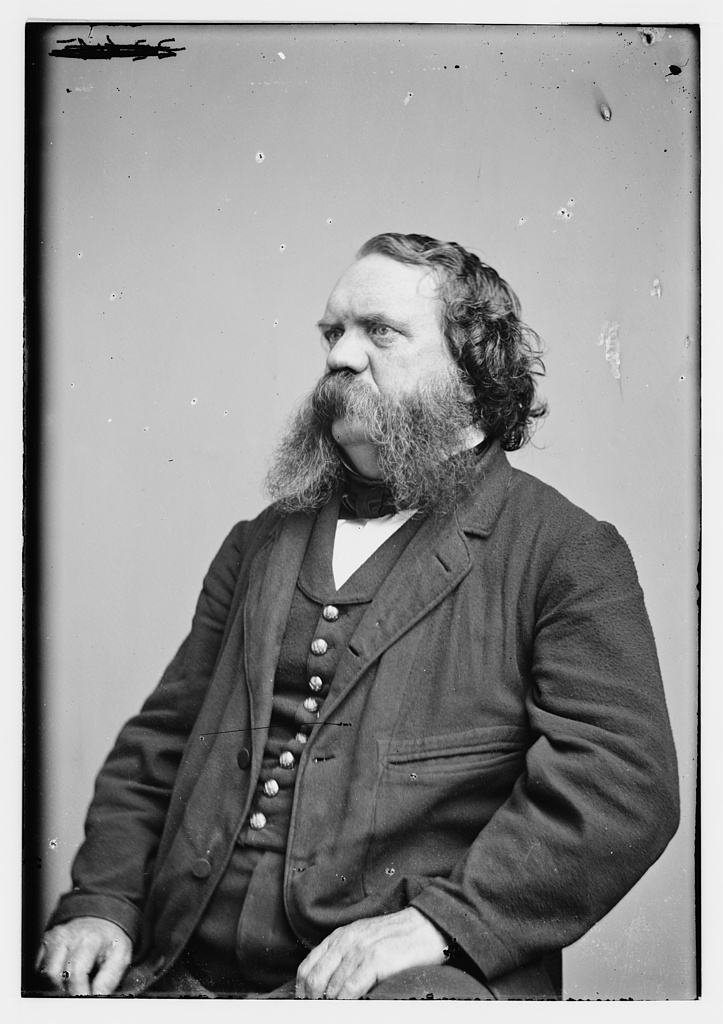
Thomas Bangs Thorpe, between 1855 and 1865

Thomas Bangs Thorpe (1815–1878) was an American antebellum humorist, painter, illustrator, and author. He is best known for the short story "The Big Bear of Arkansas", which was first published in the periodical Spirit of the Times in 1841.

== Biography ==
Thomas Bangs Thorp was born in Westfield, Massachusetts, on March 1, 1815, the first son of Reverent Thomas Thorp and Rebecca Farnham. He later added the "e" to his last name. His father died when the boy was four years old and the family, which then included two other children, soon moved to Albany, New York, to live with Farnham's parents.

He first considered a career as an artist and studied under John Quidor. He then attended Wesleyan University in Middletown, Connecticut from 1834 until 1836, and while at college gave evidence of artistic and literary talent. Thorpe's struggles with illness, however, prevented him from graduating. Seeking a warmer climate for his health, he moved to Baton Rouge, Louisiana, in 1837.

In 1838, Thorpe married Anna Maria Hinckley and the couple eventually had three children. The next year, he began publishing short stories in publications like the Spirit of the Times and The Knickerbocker. His popularity as a writer of humorous stories and character sketches set in the old Southwest grew with the publication of "The Big Bear of Arkansas" in Spirit of the Times in 1841.

In 1853, Thorpe moved to New York City, where his wife died two years later. He married his second wife, Jane Fosdick, in 1857. He died of Bright's disease in New York on September 20, 1878.

== Work ==
Thorpe is known for his perception of nature. His best-known short stories are "Tom Owen, The Bee-Hunter" and "The Big Bear of Arkansas", inspired by the natural scenery of the Southwest. Thorpe created these works with the natural setting of the Southwest in his mind. Thorpe made it his mission to showcase the scenery through his stories.

Thorpe used natural imagery and defended the well-being of life in the wild. Many of his pieces are named after animals. He did not support the way animals were used by sportsmen. One example of this is in “Wild-cat Hunting”. In this text he describes how sportsmen are not hunters and that they tormented the wild cats in the text by trapping them, shooting them from safety and make them fight dogs.

Thorpe's 1854 anti-slavery novel The Master's House focuses on a young man from North Carolina who was educated at a college in New England, then moved to Louisiana with his slaves and established a plantation there. The novel is important for its depiction of slave-trading and its mild, but persuasive, critique of slavery.
