= Jane Morgan (artist) =

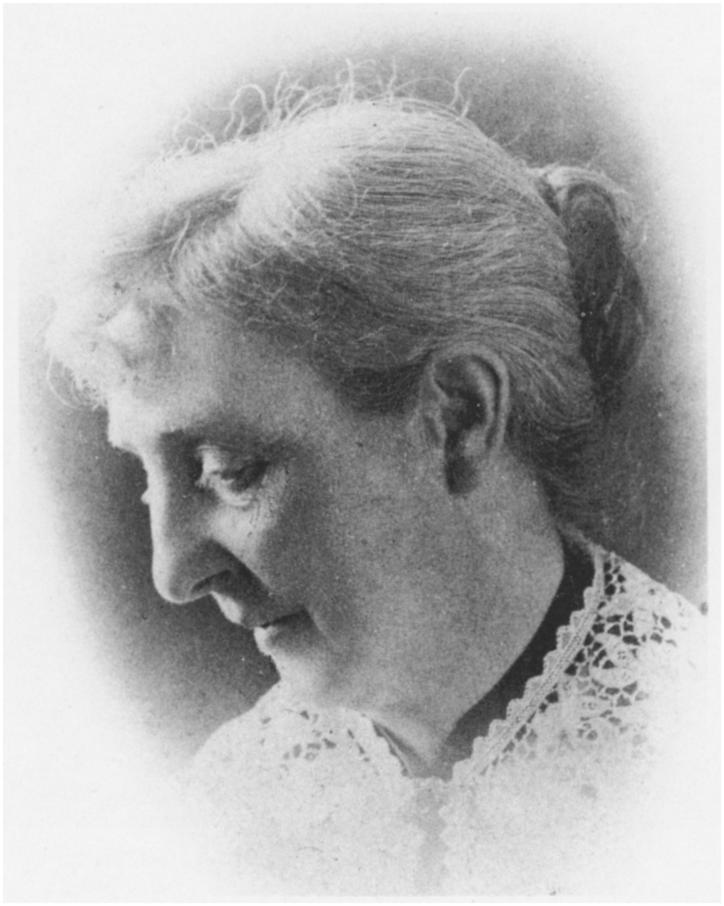
- Born: 1832; County Cork, Ireland
- Died: 4 April 1899 (aged 66–67); Staten Island, United States
- Occupations: Painter, sculptor
- Family: Maria "Middy" Morgan (sister)

Jane Morgan (1832 – 4 April 1899) was an Irish painter and sculptor.

== Early life ==
Jane Morgan was one of five children of Anthony Morgan of Prospect Hill (now called Ardnalee) Carrigrohane, County Cork, Ireland.

She studied under Robert Richard Scanlan of the Cork School of Design and Joseph Robinson Kirk. She won a prize in 1860 for her life-sized sculpture Nourmahal and exhibited two marble pieces in Dublin in 1865. In 1865, she and her sister Maria "Middy" Morgan moved to Rome, where Jane Morgan became associated with the circle of expatriate artists including Harriet Hosmer and Emma Stebbins. Jane Morgan studied art in Rome, Copenhagen, Düsseldorf, and Munich. She lived in Munich for fifteen years.

== Paintings ==
Her paintings include large-scale human tableaus skillfully capturing details like clothing, such as Monks and a Courtier (1883), in a private collection. Her Is That All? (1898) in the Ulster Museum depicts a woman and her child selling prized possessions to a pawnbroker.

In 1884, Jane Morgan joined her sister Middy in the United States, where Middy was a journalist at the New York Herald. The sisters lived in an unusual house on Dekay Street on Staten Island that drew comment in multiple newspaper articles. It was a three-storey brick house with a mansard roof. The beams were of iron and the floors of stone and tile. The upper storeys were accessible only by ladder and it was intended to be both fire- and burglar-proof. Inside, the walls were decorated by Jane Morgan with marquetry that took her five years to complete.

== Death ==
Jane Morgan's sister Middy died in 1892 and she continued to live in the family home until her death of diphtheria on 4 April 1899. After her death, the paintings and marquetry in the house were sold to a relative and reinstalled in Hollybrook House, Skibbereen, County Cork.
