= William T. Porter =

19th-century American journalist and newspaper editor

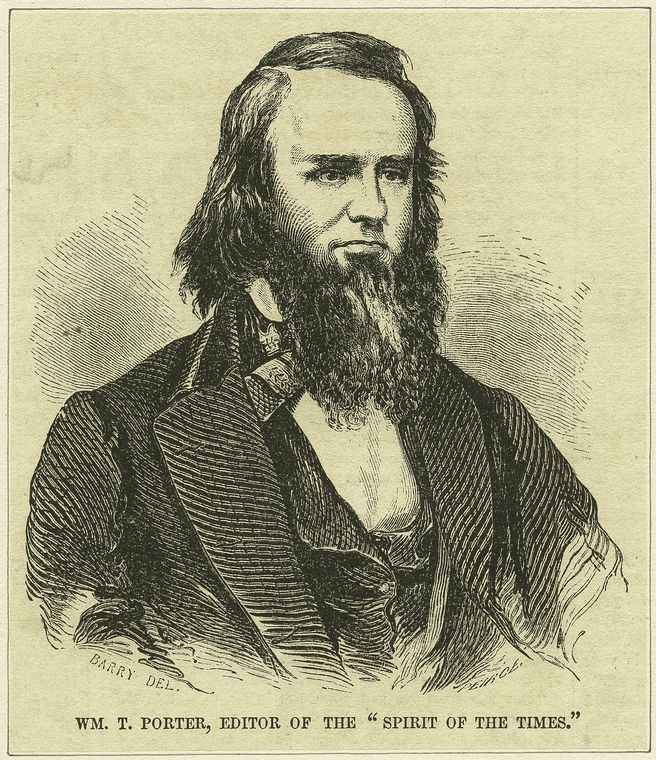
- Engraving of William T. Porter
- Born: William Trotter Porter; December 24, 1809; Newbury, Vermont
- Died: July 19, 1858 (aged 48); New York City
- Other name: William T. Porter
- Occupations: Newspaper editor and journalist

William Trotter Porter (December 24, 1809 – July 19, 1858) was an American journalist and newspaper editor who founded an early American newspaper devoted to sports. After working at a number of small newspapers, Porter moved to New York City in the 1830s. After employment at a newspaper in the city, he founded the Spirit of the Times, a newspaper modeled on a London paper called Bell's Life in London. The Spirit, which went through a number of names and incarnations over the years, was devoted to sports and other recreational pursuits. One of Porter's main interests involved horse racing, and he was involved in attempts to create the first stud book in the United States, which did not bear fruit. He was also instrumental in the development of American literature, as the Spirit published a number of short stories by American tall tale writers, and Porter edited two collections of short stories by American writers. After publishing the Spirit through the 1830s, he sold it to another printer but continued as the editor into the 1850s. He left the original Spirit in 1855 and in 1856 was hired as editor for another sporting newspaper, Porter's Spirit of the Times, published by George Wilkes. Porter died in 1858.

== Early life ==
Porter was born on December 24, 1809, the son of Benjamin Porter and Martha Olcott in Newbury, Vermont. He was one of five boys born to his parents. His father was a lawyer, but died suddenly in 1818, leaving the family in difficult financial circumstances. He attended a charity school in Hanover, New Hampshire after the family moved there, but left school to work in a print shop. He also attended Dartmouth College. His mother died in 1825, which meant the family was broken up, and Porter worked at a number of small newspapers before arriving in New York City in the early 1830s. While in New York, Porter gained the nickname of "York's Tall Son".

== Editorial work ==
Porter edited the Constellation, a newspaper in New York City that published humorous stories. Porter became interested in sports and concentrated on the emerging sports journalism field. In December 1831, Porter published the first issue of a new newspaper devoted to covering sports and other recreational activities, which he called The Spirit of the Times. Porter imitated Bell's Life in London, a contemporary English publication covering the same subjects. The first attempt at Spirit of the Times failed quickly, and Porter sold the magazine to C. J. B. Fisher, who merged it into Fisher's publication of the Traveller, and the Spirit was combined with the Traveller as the Traveller and Spirit of the Times. During the brief period that Porter operated the Spirit, he employed Horace Greeley as a typesetter. When Porter sold the Spirit, he then went to work at the New-Yorker, which was edited at the time by Horace Greeley. In January 1835, Porter purchased the Traveller and Spirit of the Times and renamed the newspaper back to Spirit of the Times, returning to editing it. This version of the Spirit managed to survive, although with some initial financial difficulties. Porter focused on selling his paper in the south and west of the United States, and emphasized subjects of use to his readers, such as cattle breeding, farm methods, books of interest, as well as sports. The newspaper was published weekly.

Porter was interested in reforming the sport of horse racing, and expended much effort in the newspaper trying to bring together horsemen in the various parts of the country. Although the effort did not bear fruit, the Spirit became a repository for information of interest to those involved in horse racing, printing statistics and results of races. Porter was also involved in attempts to publish an American stud book for race horses in the United States, similar to the General Stud Book that was published in England documenting the pedigrees of Thoroughbred horses. In February 1837, Porter announced in the Spirit the projected coverage of the project, which was to be edited by Wiley Jones Stratton, who was secretary to the National Jockey Club in Washington, D. C. But this project never materialized, and Porter turned to Patrick Nesbitt Edgar in January 1838 to take over the project. But Edgar did not finish the work, and by 1842, the project was abandoned.

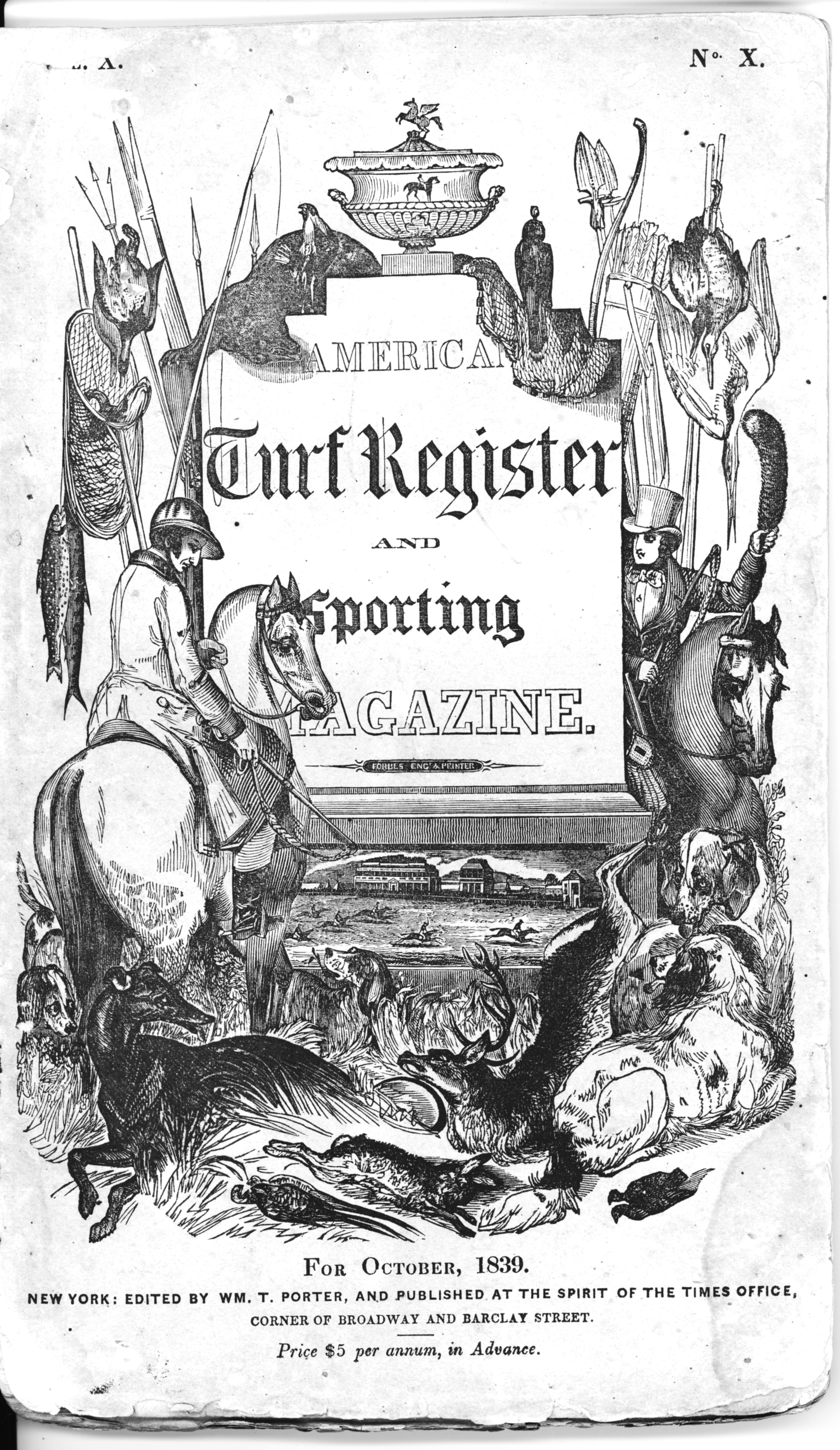
Title page of the October 1839 edition of American Turf Register, edited by Porter.

Porter also served as an arbiter of disputes about sports rules and sports betting. Porter also encouraged new authors from the South and the West to write in his newspaper and helped them get books published. He also edited two collections of short stories from the frontier, The Big Bear of Arkansas in 1846 and A Quarter Race in Kentucky and Other Sketches in 1847.

Besides the sporting interests, the Spirit was involved in the emergence of American literature, especially the "tall tale" form of humor. Porter encouraged Southwestern authors to write and publish their short stories in the Spirit, and was involved in getting their works published in book form. He was the editor for two of these collections: The Big Bear of Arkansas, published in 1846, and A Quarter Race in Kentucky and Other Sketches, published in 1847. Porter was instrumental in encouraging the career of Johnson Hooper. Another writer who contributed to the Spirit was Henry William Herbert, who wrote under the pen name "Frank Forester".

The Panic of 1837 hurt the Spirit's circulation, but Porter responded by buying out his main competition, the American Turf Register and Sporting Magazine and moved it to New York City. Porter edited the Turf Register until the paper stopped being published in 1844. Porter continued the publication of annual stallion lists and the publication of lists of horses owned by breeders. However, the purchase of the American Turf Register strained Porter's finances, and he sold the Spirit to another printer, John Richards, who retained Porter as editor. The 1840s were prosperous, but in the 1850s the magazine again encountered difficulties. Around 1855, Porter left Richards' paper, and in 1856, another printer, George Wilkes, began a new sporting newspaper, which he called Porter's Spirit of the Times, and employed Porter as editor.

== Later life ==
In 1845, Porter served as secretary for the New York Jockey Club during the famous match race between the fillies Fashion and Peytona at the Union Course on May 15, 1845. Although the Spirit and the American Turf Register were known for their coverage of horse racing, Porter's main sporting interest for himself was fishing.

Porter never married, and three of his brothers died before Porter himself caught a cold and died of consumption on July 19, 1858, in his house in New York City. He left unfinished a biography of his friend Wiliam Herbert. The journalist and historian Frank Luther Mott wrote that "Porter undoubtedly did much to give American sports a respectable standing."
