= Jockey Club (United States) =

Breed registry for Thoroughbred horses

The Jockey Club is an American organization that oversees the breed registry for Thoroughbred horses in the United States and Canada. It is dedicated to the improvement of Thoroughbred breeding and racing, and it fulfills that mandate by serving many segments of the industry through its subsidiary companies and by supporting numerous industry initiatives.

The Jockey Club was formed on February 9, 1894, and it is the keeper of the American Stud Book. It came into existence after James R. Keene spearheaded a drive for support of racehorse trainers who had complained about the Board of Control that governed racing in New York State.

== About ==
Upon its formation, the Jockey Club included the existing members of the Board of Control and was overseen by seven appointed stewards. Its twenty-seven founding members included prominent and wealthy sportsmen such as Philip J. Dwyer, John A. Morris, William Kissam Vanderbilt, and William Collins Whitney.

Founding officers:

- Chairman - John Hunter (co-owner of Saratoga Race Course)
- Vice Chairman - James R. Keene (stockbroker, racehorse owner/breeder)
- Secretary-Treasurer - Frank K. Sturgis (President of the New York Stock Exchange)

Founding stewards:

- John Hunter
- James R. Keene
- Frank K. Sturgis
- August Belmont Jr.
- J. O. Domer
- Col. William P. Thompson
- Gideon Lee Knapp

The Jockey Club is the registry for all Thoroughbred horses in the United States and Canada, and maintains offices in New York City and Lexington, Kentucky. The Registry maintained by the Jockey Club, called the American Stud Book, dates back to the club's founding and contains the descendants of those horses listed, as well as horses imported into North America up to the present.

Participants in the Registry program agree to allow the Registry to conduct genetic testing to verify parentage as well as arbitrating any disputes between owners. The Jockey Club has taken the position that it will not allow cloned Thoroughbreds to be registered in the American Stud Book, making it impossible for such horses to compete in most races. The club has consistently prohibited artificial insemination throughout its history, only allowing the registration of horses born through "natural" procreation.

Naming of foals is also controlled by the Jockey Club and includes a number of conventions. Names may not consist of more than 18 letters (with spaces and punctuation marks counting as letters), contain initials such as C.O.D., F.O.B., etc., or end in "filly," "colt," "stud," "mare," "stallion," or any similar horse-related term. Names may also not end with a numerical designation such as "2nd" or "3rd," whether or not such a designation is spelled out. Names of persons may not be used unless written permission to use their names is on file (examples of such permission are actor Jack Klugman, whose namesake competed in the Kentucky Derby, and tennis star Chris Evert, whose namesake is in the National Museum of Racing and Hall of Fame). The names of "notorious" people may never be used, nor can namesakes of racetracks, races, or stable names. Trademarks and copyrighted names are similarly not allowed as are vulgar, obscene or offensive ones. The list also protects names of currently active horses as well as horses enrolled in the National Museum of Racing and Hall of Fame or other well-known horses, including winners of the Kentucky Derby, Preakness Stakes, Belmont Stakes, Jockey Club Gold Cup or Breeders' Cup events.

The Jockey Club (United States) participates with Thoroughbred Owners and Breeders Association (TOBA), i.e., thoroughbred owners & breeders, professionals, and others who support and promote Thoroughbred ownership (and sponsorship), such as through networking and a high level of education.

=== Charities ===
Created in 1984, the Jockey Club Research Foundation was joined along with the Grayson Foundation, established in 1940 by George D. Widener Jr., William Woodward Sr. and John Hay Whitney, among others. It is now known as the Grayson-Jockey Club Research Foundation Inc.

The Grayson-Jockey Club Research Foundation is the nation's leading source of equine research funding and it helps all breeds.

The Jockey Club Safety Net Foundation is a charitable trust that provides, on a confidential basis, financial relief and assistance to needy members of the Thoroughbred industry and their families.

Assistance includes financial aid, medication, surgical and hospital costs, therapeutic equipment, voice-recognition computers for quadriplegics and wheelchair-accessible vans, among other needs.

=== NTRA ===
The Jockey Club formed the National Thoroughbred Racing Association (NTRA) in 1998 with the Breeders' Cup Limited, Thoroughbred Owners and Breeders Association, Keeneland Association, Oak Tree Racing Association and the National Thoroughbred Association. The Jockey Club maintains a seat on the board of directors of the NTRA.

== Breeding Bureau ==
Believing the Thoroughbred was the best breed of horse and could pass on its superior traits to other breeds, in 1906 The Jockey Club of New York established the Breeding Bureau. Its purpose was to provide Thoroughbred stallions as sires that would produce a variety of top quality half-breed general purpose horses.

During World War I, the Breeding Bureau expanded the part of the program which had been providing horses for the United States Army Cavalry Remount Service. Some of the prominent Thoroughbred runners who were donated to the Cavalry Remount Service include:

- Gold Heels - winner of the 1902 Suburban Handicap;
- Sir Huon - winner of the 1906 Latonia and Kentucky Derbys;
- George Smith - winner of the 1916 Kentucky Derby;
- Behave Yourself - winner of the 1921 Kentucky Derby;
- Hurryoff - winner of the 1933 Belmont Stakes.

== Experimental Free Handicap ==
Since 1933, the Jockey Club has compiled the Experimental Free Handicap, a weight-based assessment of the previous year's 2-year-olds based on a theoretical race at a distance of 1 ^{1}/16 miles.

== America's Best Racing ==
TJC Media Ventures is a commercial subsidiary of the Jockey Club that oversees the new-fan development activities, primarily under the "America's Best Racing" (ABR) brand.

ABR led partnerships with influencers and celebrities, of which the most notable is with social media influencer Griffin Johnson. Johnson went on to bring the sport "unprecedented exposure".
