= 20th Kentucky Infantry Regiment =

- Active: January 6, 1862, to January 17, 1865
- Country: United States
- Allegiance: Union
- Branch: Infantry
- Engagements: Battle of Shiloh; Siege of Corinth; Battle of Perryville; Battle of Dallas; Battle of New Hope Church; Battle of Allatoona; Battle of Kennesaw Mountain; Siege of Atlanta; Battle of Jonesboro

The 20th Kentucky Infantry Regiment was an infantry regiment that served in the Union Army during the American Civil War.

== Service ==
The 20th Kentucky Infantry Regiment was organized at Lexington, Kentucky, Camp Dick Robinson, and Smithfield, Kentucky and mustered in for a three-year enlistment on January 6, 1862.

The regiment was attached to 22nd Brigade, Army of the Ohio, to February 1862. 22nd Brigade, 4th Division, Army of the Ohio, to September 1862. 22nd Brigade, 4th Division, II Corps, Army of the Ohio, to November 1862. 1st Brigade, 2nd Division, Left Wing, XIV Corps, Army of the Cumberland, to December 1862. District of West Kentucky, Department of the Ohio, to June 1863. Unassigned, 2nd Division, XXIII Corps, Department of the Ohio, to August 1863. District of Louisville, Kentucky, 1st Division, XXIII Corps, to April 1864. 2nd Brigade, 2nd Division, District of Kentucky, 5th Division, XXIII Corps, to May 1864. 3rd Brigade, 2nd Division, XXIII Corps, to December 1864. Unattached, District of Kentucky, to January 1865.

The 20th Kentucky Infantry mustered out of service on January 17, 1865.

== Detailed service ==
The regiment united at Smithland and was ordered to Louisville, Ky.; thence to Bardstown, Ky., January 1862, and duty there until February. March to Nashville, Tenn., February 23-March 12; thence march to Savannah, Tenn., March 13-April 6. Battle of Shiloh, April 6–7. Advance on and siege of Corinth, Miss., April 29-May 30. Phillips' Creek, Widow Serratt's, May 21. Bridge Creek, before Corinth, May 28. Occupation of Corinth May 30 and pursuit to Booneville May 31-June 6. Buell's Campaign in northern Alabama and middle Tennessee June to August. March to Nashville, Tenn.; thence to Louisville, Ky., in pursuit of Bragg, August 20-September 26. Pursuit of Bragg into Kentucky October 1–22, Glasgow, Ky., October 5. Battle of Perryville October 8. Camp Wild Cat October 17. March to Nashville, Tenn., October 22-November 9, and duty there until December 19. Ordered to Bowling Green, Ky., December 19, and duty there and guarding railroad at various points in Kentucky until July 1863. Morgan's attack on Lebanon July 5. Regiment mostly captured, at Camp Nelson until July 28. Ordered to Louisville, Ky., and provost duty there until May 15, 1864. Ordered to join Sherman's army in the field May 15. Operations and battles about Dallas, New Hope Church and Allatoona Hills May 30-June 5. Ackworth June 3–4. Operations about Marietta and against Kennesaw Mountain June 10-July 2. Pine Hill June 11–14. Lost Mountain June 15–17. Muddy Creek June 17. Noyes' Creek June 19. Kolb's Farm June 22. Assault on Kennesaw June 27. Nickajack Creek July 2–5. Chattahoochie River July 6–17. Decatur July 19. Howard House July 20. Siege of Atlanta July 22-August 25. Utoy Creek August 5–7. Flank movement on Jonesboro August 25–30. Battle of Jonesboro August 31-September 1. Lovejoy's Station September 2–6. Ordered to Louisville, Ky., September, and guard duty there until January 1865.

== Casualties ==
The regiment lost a total of 233 men during service; 36 enlisted men killed or mortally wounded, 3 officers and 194 enlisted men died of disease.

== Commanders ==
- Colonel Sanders D. Bruce
- Lieutenant Colonel Charles S. Hanson

== See also ==
- List of Kentucky Civil War Units
- Kentucky in the Civil War
