= American Stud Book =

Stub book for the American Thoroughbred horse breed

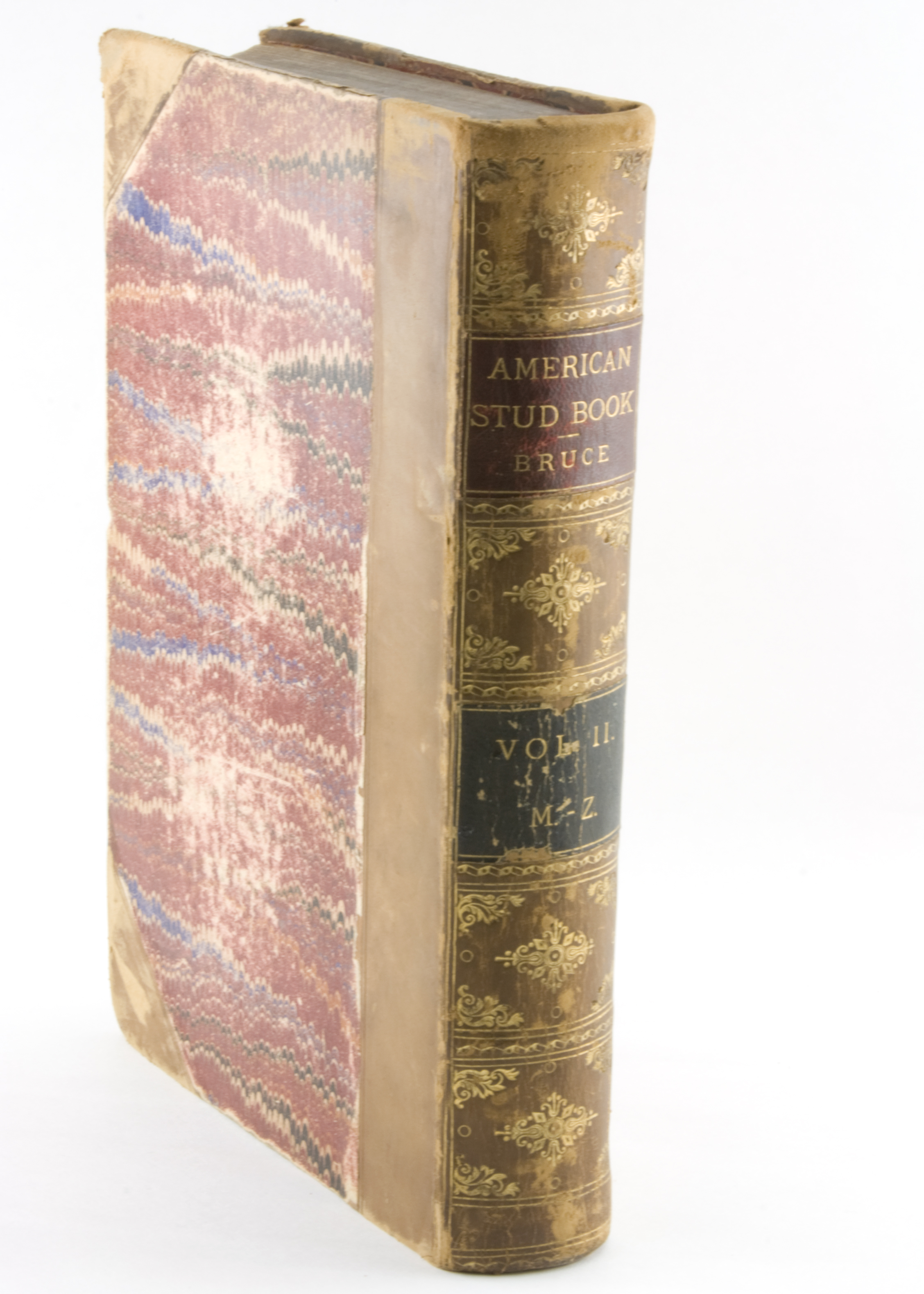
Volume Two of the American Stud Book compiled by Sanders Bruce and published in 1873

The American Stud Book is the stud book for the Thoroughbred horse in the United States. It was founded by Sanders D. Bruce, with assistance from his brother B. G. Bruce in 1868. In 1896, the Jockey Club bought out Bruce and assumed publication of the book, which it has continued to the present.

The American Stud Book was first published, as volume one, in 1868, covering the first part of the alphabet from A to K. In 1873, a revised volume one and a second volume were published, with the new volume one covering A through L. Bruce continued publishing the volumes, but a fire in his offices right before volume five was published put him in financial difficulty, and he then entered into a legal fight with The Jockey Club over the right to publish the American Stud Book, which was finally settled in 1896 when The Jockey Club bought the American Stud Book from Bruce for $35,000.

Currently the American Stud Book includes all Thoroughbred horses foaled in the United States, Canada, and Puerto Rico. It also includes any Thoroughbreds imported into those places from other countries, as long as those countries' Thoroughbred stud books are approved by The Jockey Club.
