= Henry William Herbert =

Anglo-American author (1807–1858)

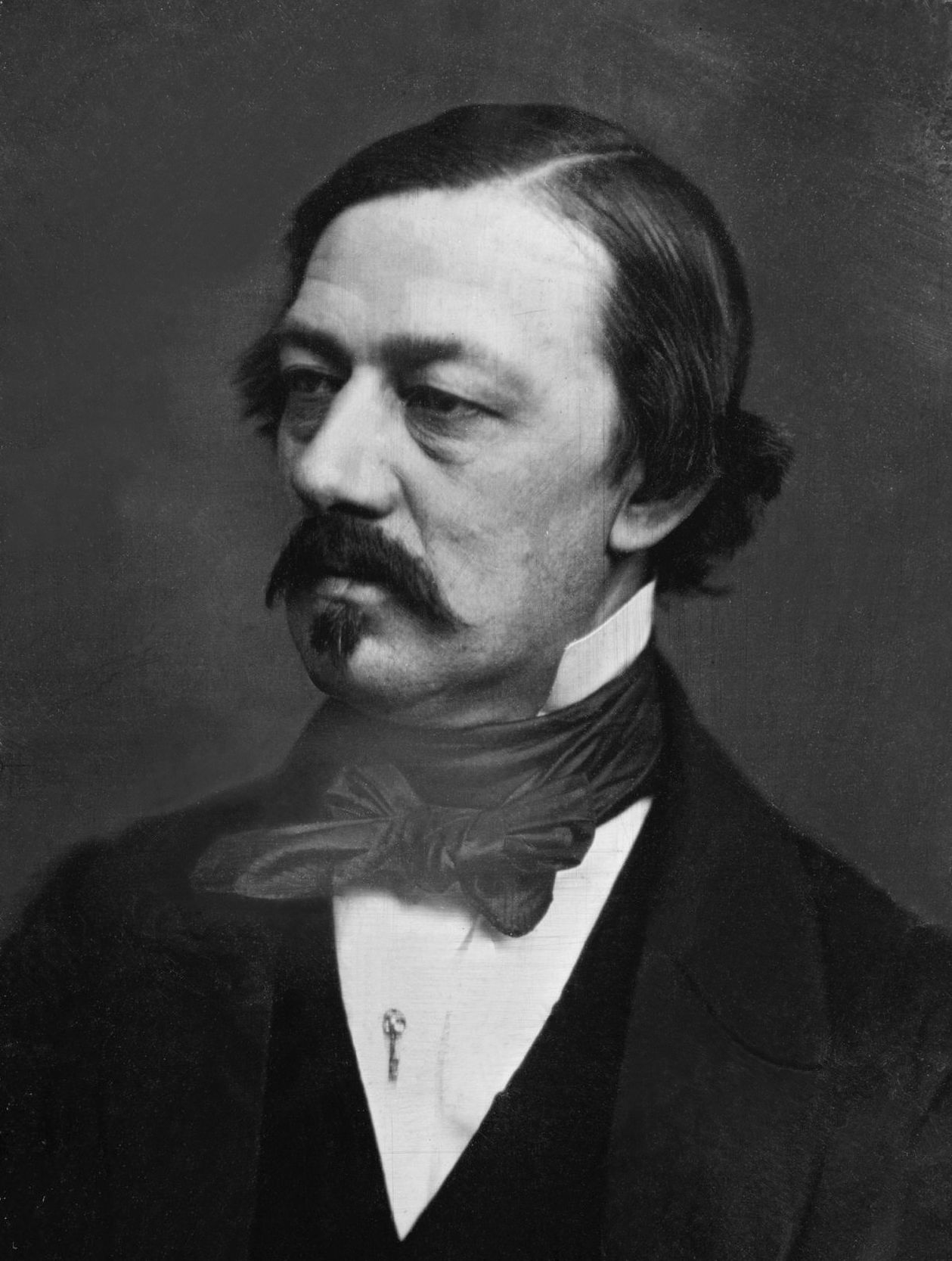
Henry William Herbert

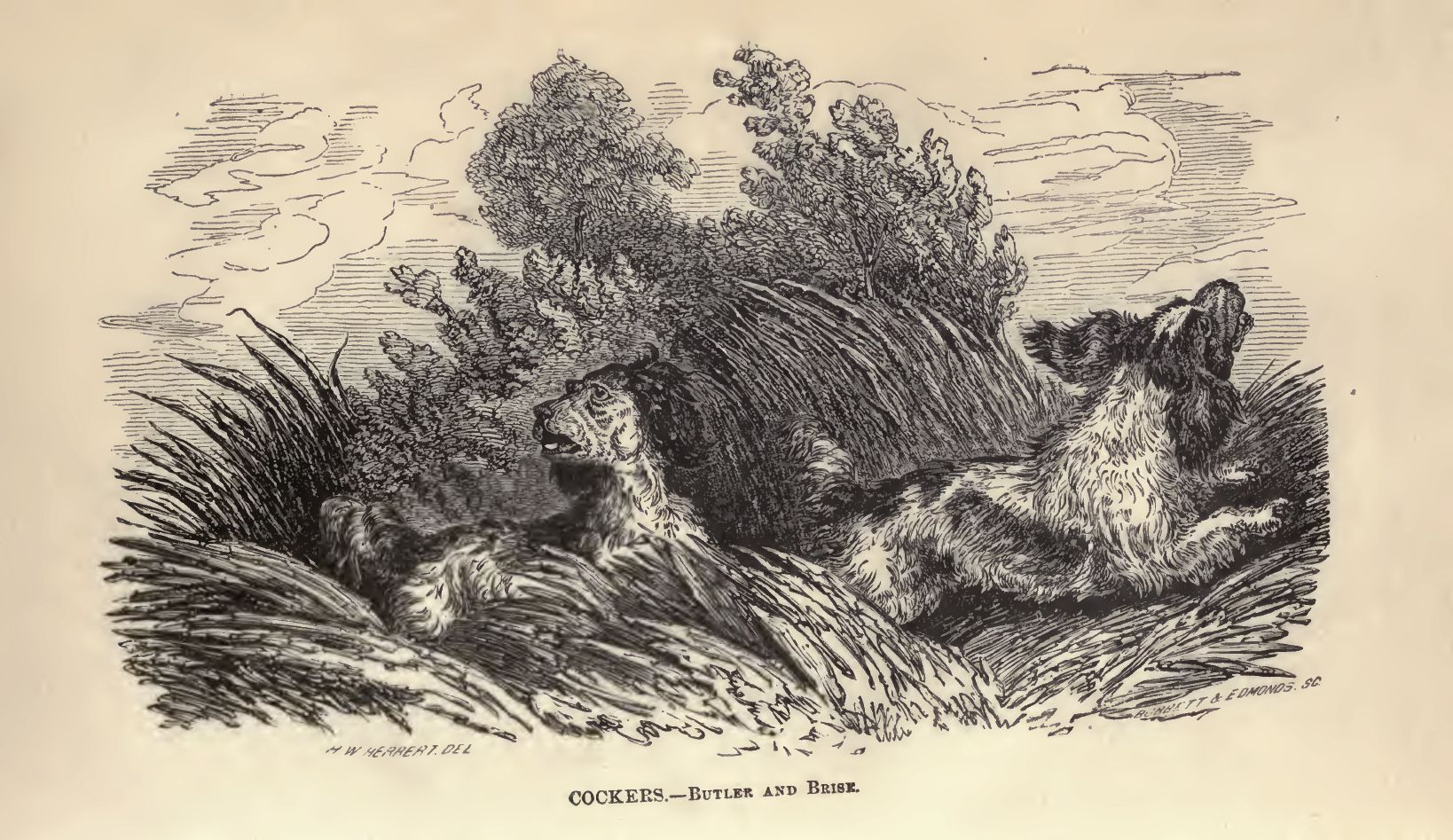
Cocker Spaniels from Herbert's "The Dog"

Henry William Herbert (7 April 1807 – 17 May 1858), pen name Frank Forester, was an English-born American novelist, poet, historian, illustrator, journalist and writer on sport. Starr writes that "as a classical scholar he had few equals in the United States . . . his knowledge of English history and literature was extensive; he was a pen-and-ink artist of marked ability; as a sportsman he was unsurpassed; his pupils idolized him."

== Biography ==
The eldest son of William Herbert, Dean of Manchester (himself the son of Henry Herbert, 1st Earl of Carnarvon), Herbert was born in London.

Herbert was educated at Eton College and at Caius College, Cambridge, where he graduated BA in 1830. Having lost his property through a dishonest agent, he emigrated to the United States in 1831 and for the following eight years taught Latin and Greek at a private school in New York City. In 1833 he started the American Monthly Magazine, which he edited, in conjunction with A. D. Patterson, until 1835 when he withdrew as a result of disagreements with his associate, Charles Fenno Hoffman. His vanity and arrogance due to his ancestry, his father being the son of the Earl of Carnarvon and his mother, the Hon. Letitia Emily Dorothea Allen, a daughter of Viscount Allen, did not win him many friends. Edgar Allan Poe felt that he was "not unapt to fall into pompous grandiloquence" and sometimes was "woefully turgid", while others saw his novels as "prolix, lacking in imagination and humor."

Herbert was a man of varied accomplishments, translating many of the novels of Eugène Sue and Alexandre Dumas, père into English. He is listed as a contributor to the first edition of The New American Cyclopedia by way of writing articles on Archery, Armour, Austerlitz, Balaklava, St. Bartholomew Massacre, Carthage, Charles I & II of England, Charles XII of Sweden etc.

In 1839 Herbert married Sarah Barker, of Bangor, Maine. They had one son, William George, and one daughter, Louisa. Sarah died 11 March 1844 and was buried in Newark, New Jersey. Their daughter, Louisa, died on 19 August of the same year. William George, their son, was sent to school in England and remained there. Fifteen years later Herbert married Adela Budlong, who filed for divorce after three months.

Herbert was staying at the Stevens Hotel in Manhattan, New York City and invited several men to dine with him on what would be the last night of his life. Only one gentleman accepted his invention, Philip Hone Anthon, a pupil of Herbert's, who accepted the invitation because, as he testified at the inquest, Herbert "had complained of feeling very lonely because his wife had left him". After this he begged Anthon to spend as much time as possible with him. While talking with Anthon, Herbert dashed into his bedroom and shot himself. He killed himself on 17 May 1858 at 2:00 am.

== Publications ==
In 1834 Herbert published his first novel, The Brothers: a Tale of the Fronde, which was followed by a number of others that achieved popularity including:

- The Village Inn; or the Adventures of Bellechassaigne (1843)
- Marmaduke Wyvil; or The Maid's Revenge (1843)
- The Lord Of The Manor; or, Rose Castleton's Temptation: An Old English Story (1844)
- Guarica, the Charib Bride: A Legend of Hispaniola (1844)
- The Warwick Woodlands; or Things as They Were There (1845)
- The Roman Traitor; or the Days of Cicero, Cato and Cataline [sic], A True Tale of The Republic (1846)
- The Deerstalkers; or, Circumstantial Evidence: A Tale of the South-Western Counties (1849)
- The Fair Puritan. An historical romance of the Days of Witchcraft

Herbert also wrote a series of historical studies, including:

- Cromwell: An Historical Novel (1838)
- Dermot O'Brien, or, The taking of Tredagh : a tale of 1649 (1849)
- The Captains of the Old World; as Compared with the Great Modern Strategists (1851)
- The Cavaliers of England (1852)
- The Knights of England, France and Scotland (1852)
- The Chevaliers of France (1853)
- Memoirs Of Henry The Eighth Of England With The Fortunes And Characters Of His Six Wives (1855)

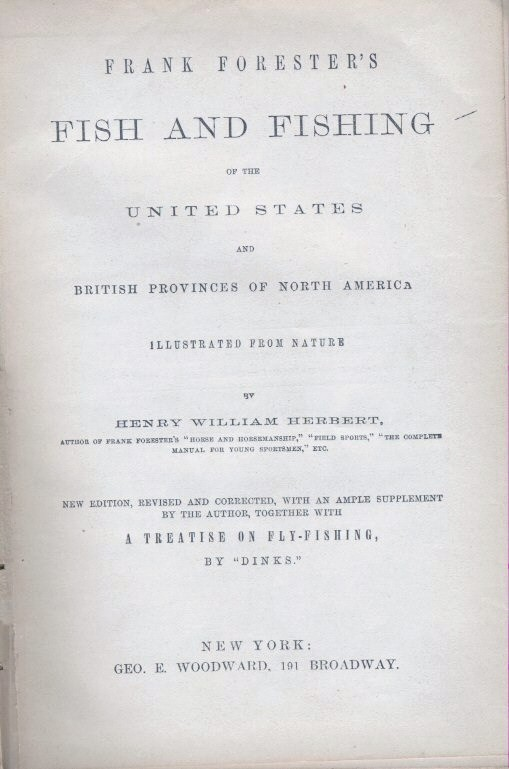
Title Page of Frank Forester's Fish and Fishing of The United States (1859)

Herbert also translated Aeschylus:

The Prometheus and Agamemnon of Aeschylus (1849)

Herbert contributed to one of the early sporting magazines in the United States, the Spirit of the Times, and was well known for his works on sport, published under the pseudonym of Frank Forester. These include:

- The Field Sports of the United States and British Provinces (1849)
- Frank Forester and his Friends (1849)
- The Fish and Fishing of the United States (1850)
- The Young Sportsman's Complete Manual (1852)
- The Horse and Horsemanship in the United States and British Provinces of North America (1858)
