= Sanders D. Bruce =

American racehorse owner (1825–1902)

Sanders Dewees Bruce
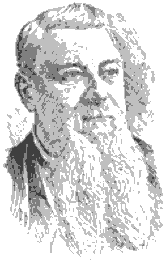
- Born: August 16, 1825; Lexington, Kentucky, US
- Died: January 31, 1902 (aged 76); New York City, US
- Military career
- Allegiance: United States; Union
- Branch: United States Army; Union Army
- Service years: 1861-1864
- Rank: Colonel, U.S.V
- Commands: 20th Kentucky Volunteer Infantry
- Conflicts: American Civil War: Battle of Shiloh
- Other work: writer, author, horse breeder

Sanders Dewees Bruce (1825–1902) was a Union Army colonel during the American Civil War and an expert on horse breeding. He authored the American Stud Book and The Horse-breeder's Guide and Handbook.

== Early life ==
Bruce was born on August 16, 1825, in Lexington, Kentucky. His father, John Bruce, was native to England and was believed to be a direct descendant of Robert the Bruce. His sister, Rebecca Bruce, married John Hunt Morgan a future Confederate cavalry officer.

Sanders Bruce was a graduate of Transylvania University in 1846 and afterward went into the mercantile business. In response to John Brown's raid on Harpers Ferry, state militias were bolstered to deal with similar uprisings. Bruce was commissioned captain of the Lexington Chasseurs in the Kentucky State Militia under the direction of Simon B. Buckner as Inspector General.

== Civil War ==
Bruce chose to fight for the Union during the Civil War despite his ties to such future Confederates as Morgan and Buckner. When Buckner sided with the Confederates, Bruce assumed responsibilities as Inspector General of the Kentucky Militia in 1861. He became colonel of the 20th Regiment Kentucky Volunteer Infantry which was mustered into Federal service on January 6, 1862. In February, he assumed command of the 22nd Brigade in General William "Bull" Nelson's 4th Division of the Army of the Ohio.

Bruce led his brigade in the march to reinforce Ulysses S. Grant's army at Pittsburg Landing during the Battle of Shiloh. Nelson's division was the first unit of the Army of the Ohio to reach the battlefield. On April 7, Bruce's brigade attacked through the Wicker Field and beyond Bloody Pond. His brigade was then stalled by Confederate counterattack in the Sarah Bell Field heightening tensions between him and General Nelson. When the Confederates retreated in general, Bruce's brigade advanced to the south end of the peach orchard where it remained as the battle ended.

Following the battle of Shiloh, Bruce suffered a stroke which forced him to relinquish field command. He served as post commander of Bowling Green, Kentucky, and Clarksville, Tennessee. He later served as Provost Marshal of Lexington, Kentucky, and commanded an infantry brigade under Jeremiah T. Boyle on garrison duty in Kentucky. Colonel Bruce resigned from Federal service on June 24, 1864.

== Post-war career ==
Bruce moved to New York City where he used his expertise and knowledge of horse breeding to begin publication The Turf, Field and Farm, a periodical devoted to turf and field sports. He also became a member of the Coney Island Jockey Club. Bruce continued to write extensively on horse breeding. Among his works on this subject were American Stud Book and The Horse-breeder's Guide and Handbook.

Sanders Bruce died in New York City on January 31, 1902.
