= The Turf, Field and Farm =

New York journal of turf and field sports

The Turf, Field and Farm was a New York journal of turf and field sports founded in 1865 by Sanders D. Bruce, and published until 1903. The nucleus of the original magazine was formed with assets purchased from the struggling Spirit of the Times magazine.

After the Civil War The Turf, Field and Farm was one of the three leading newspapers in New York City. Two of the three were mainly devoted to horse racing, the other being Spirit of the Times.
