= Serpell =

Serpell is a surname. Notable people with the surname include:

- Christopher Serpell (1910–1991), English journalist
- David Serpell (1911–2008), British civil servant who wrote the Serpell Report
- Grant Serpell (born 1944), English musician
- James Serpell (born 1952), American zoologist
- Namwali Serpell (born 1980), Zambian writer
- Robert Serpell (born 1944), British psychologist

== See also ==
- Serpell Report
