= Adolf Hitler and vegetarianism =

Adolf Hitler's abstention from the consumption of meat

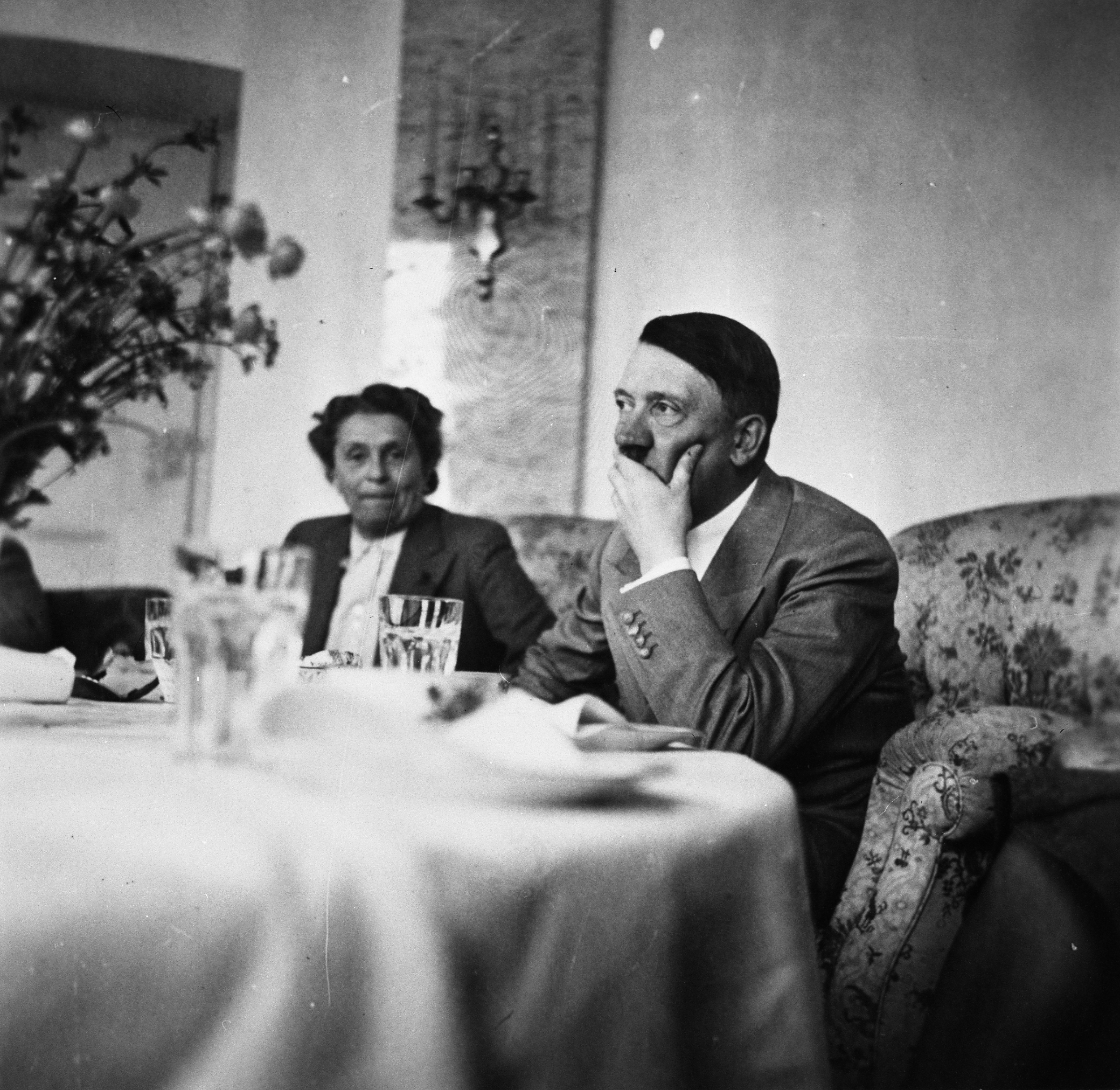
Adolf Hitler at a dinner table

Near the end of his life, Adolf Hitler followed a vegetarian diet. It is not clear when or why he adopted it, since some accounts of his dietary habits prior to the Second World War indicate that he ate meat as late as 1937. In 1938 Hitler's doctors put him on a meat-free diet, and his public image as a vegetarian and a lover of animals was fostered; from 1942 he described himself as a vegetarian.

Personal accounts from people who knew Hitler and were familiar with his diet indicate that he did not eat meat as part of his diet during this period, as several contemporaneous witnesses—such as Albert Speer (in his memoirs, Inside the Third Reich)—noted that Hitler used vivid and gruesome descriptions of animal suffering and slaughter at the dinner table to try to dissuade his colleagues from eating meat. An examination carried out by French forensic pathologists on a fragment of Hitler's mandible in 2018 found no traces of meat fibre in the tartar on Hitler's teeth.

Several eyewitness sources maintain Hitler was a vegetarian because of his concern for animal suffering, noting that he was often distressed by images of animal cruelty and suffering, and was an antivivisectionist. However, some modern-day analyses have speculated that Hitler's vegetarianism may have been for health reasons or for ideological reasons due to the composer Richard Wagner's historical theories, or even a psychological reaction to his niece's death rather than a commitment to animal welfare. Additionally, some historians and commentators argue that his vegetarianism was exaggerated or manipulated to bolster his public image. In The Life and Death of Adolf Hitler (1973) the historian Robert Payne claimed that Joseph Goebbels, the Nazi propaganda minister, portrayed Hitler as "an ascetic without vices," highlighting his avoidance of drinking, smoking, and eating meat to depict him as virtuous.

== Contemporary records ==
Do you know that your Führer is a vegetarian, and that he does not eat meat because of his general attitude toward life and his love for the world of animals? Do you know that your Führer is an exemplary friend of animals, and even as a chancellor, he is not separated from the animals he has kept for years?...The Führer is an ardent opponent of any torture of animals, in particular vivisection, and has declared to terminate those conditions...thus fulfilling his role as the saviour of animals, from continuous and nameless torments and pain.

— Neugeist/Die Weisse Fahne (contemporaneous pro-Nazi children's magazine)

In a 1937 article, The New York Times noted "It is well known that Hitler is a vegetarian and does not drink or smoke. The lunch and dinner consist, therefore, for the most part of soup, eggs, vegetables and mineral water, although he occasionally relishes a slice of ham and relieves the tediousness of his diet with such delicacies as caviar ...". In another 1937 article Times magazine noted "Strictly vegetarian and teetotaler Adolf Hitler made the great exception last week of nibbling clear through the State banquet he gave Benito Mussolini and toasting his guest in sweet German champagne. Menu: caviar, soup, sole, chicken, ices and fresh fruit".

In November 1938 an article for the English magazine Homes & Gardens describing Hitler's mountain home, the Berghof, stated that in addition to being a teetotaler and a non-smoker, Hitler was also a vegetarian. Ignatius Phayre wrote, "A life-long vegetarian at table, Hitler's kitchen plots are both varied and heavy in produce. Even in his meatless diet Hitler is something of a gourmet – as Sir John Simon and Anthony Eden were surprised to note when they dined with him in the Chancellery at Berlin. His Bavarian chef, Herr Kannenberg, contrives an imposing array of vegetarian dishes, savoury and rich, pleasing to the eye as well as to the palate, and all conforming to the dietic standards which Hitler exacts."

According to stenographic transcripts translated by Hugh Trevor-Roper of conversations between Hitler and his inner circle which took place between July 1941 and November 1944, Hitler regarded himself as a vegetarian. These conversations were gathered together under the title Hitler's Table Talk. Written notes taken at the time were transcribed and then were edited by Martin Bormann. According to these transcripts dated 11 November 1941, Hitler said, "One may regret living at a period when it's impossible to form an idea of the shape the world of the future will assume. But there's one thing I can predict to eaters of meat: the world of the future will be vegetarian." On 12 January 1942, he said, "The only thing of which I shall be incapable is to share the sheiks' mutton with them. I'm a vegetarian, and they must spare me from their meat." In a diary entry dated 26 April 1942, Joseph Goebbels described Hitler as a committed vegetarian, writing,

An extended chapter of our talk was devoted by the Führer to the vegetarian question. He believes more than ever that meat-eating is harmful to humanity. Of course he knows that during the war we cannot completely upset our food system. After the war, however, he intends to tackle this problem also. Maybe he is right. Certainly the arguments that he adduces in favor of his standpoint are very compelling.

In his table talks, on 25 April 1942 at midday, Hitler addressed the issue of vegetarianism and spoke about Roman soldiers eating fruits and cereals and the importance of raw vegetables. He placed the emphasis on scientific arguments such as naturalists' observations and chemical efficacy. Eva Braun was fond of turtle soup and notes from the interrogation of Hitler's personal aides about his daily routine in 1944 reveal that after midnight she would "direct that there should be another light snack of turtle soup, sandwiches, and sausages".

== Personal testimony and secondhand accounts ==
Hitler tolerated [Marlene von Exner]'s reproaches and remained kindly and thoughtful. He liked her lively manner, was very fond of Viennese puddings, and admired her skill in making vegetarian soups that tasted better than meat broth. He couldn’t guess that poor Marlene was unhappy about his modest demands. With Antonescu, despite his diet, she had been able to revel in lobster, mayonnaise, caviar and other delicacies, and she had cooked fine dinners for festive receptions. But Hitler, as usual, wanted nothing but his one-pot dishes, carrots with potatoes. 'He’ll never thrive on food like this,’ she wailed, and she simmered a bone in his soup now and then.

— Traudl Junge, Until the Final Hour: Hitler's Last Secretary (2004)

All accounts by people familiar with Hitler's diet from 1942 onwards are in agreement that Hitler adhered to a vegetarian diet, but accounts of his diet prior to the Second World War are inconsistent in this regard with some stating he ate meat. Dione Lucas, a chef at a Hamburg hotel patronised by Hitler prior to the war, claimed that her stuffed squab was a favourite of his. According to Ilse Hess (wife of Rudolf Hess), in 1937, Hitler ceased eating meat except for Leberknödel (liver dumplings). In his memoirs, Rochus Misch (who served as Hitler's bodyguard from 1940) states that during a train ride in 1941 he "saw Hitler eat meat for the only time in the five years I was with him".

Margot Wölk, who became his unwilling food-taster in 1942, stated that all the food she tested for Hitler was vegetarian, and she recalled no meat or fish. This account was backed up in 2017 when the Russian Federal Security Service granted permission to a team of French scientists to undertake an examination of bones that purportedly belonged to Hitler. An analysis of the tartar deposits found on the teeth and dentures found no traces of meat fibre. From an interview with the forensic pathologist Philippe Charlier, who led the study, Agence France-Presse reported that Charlier had said that the analysis of Hitler's bad teeth and numerous dentures found white tartar deposits and no traces of meat fibre, and that the dictator was vegetarian. Charlier and his colleagues also added that though they were confident that the bones belonged to Hitler based on historical records, they cautioned that “further DNA analyses may be useful" to ensure its authenticity.

Traudl Junge, who became Hitler's secretary in 1942, reported that he "always avoided meat" but that his Austrian cook Kruemel sometimes added a little animal broth or fat to his meals. "Mostly the Fuehrer would notice the attempt at deception, would get very annoyed and then get tummy ache," Junge said. "At the end he would only let Kruemel cook him clear soup and mashed potato." In addition, Marlene von Exner, who became Hitler's dietitian in 1943, reportedly added bone marrow to his soups without his knowledge because she "despised" his vegetarian diet.

Even though Hitler adhered to a vegetarian diet during this period, his physician, Theodor Morell, administered many unorthodox medications that contained animal by-products from 1936 until Hitler's death in 1945. These included Glyconorm (an injectable compound containing cardiac muscle, adrenal gland, liver, and pancreas), placenta, bovine testosterone, and extracts containing seminal vesicles and prostate. At the time, extracts from animal glands were popularly believed to be "elixirs of youth", but it is not known whether Hitler requested them or blindly accepted them.

Though Hitler was probably fully vegetarian in the last three years of his life, he was never vegan. He drank milk and ate eggs, and wore leather clothes and shoes until his last day. Even the inside pockets of his trousers were unusually made of leather and not cloth.

== Analysis ==
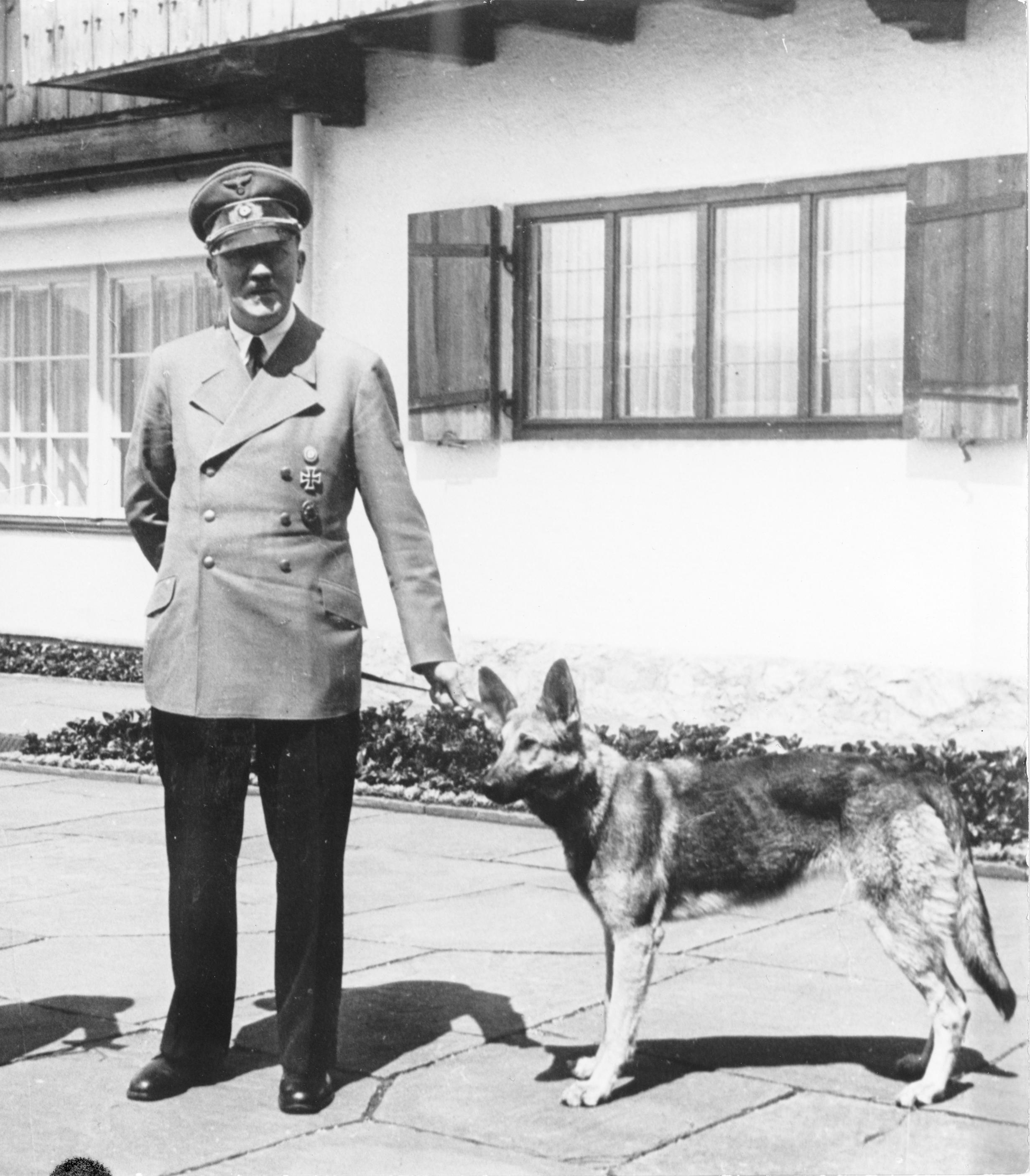
Hitler with his German Shepherd, Blondi

Prior to the Second World War, there are many accounts of Hitler's eating meat (including stuffed squab and Bavarian sausages) and caviar. According to Ilse Hess, in 1937 Hitler ceased eating all meat except for liver dumplings, an account that Dr Kalechofsky found "consistent with other descriptions of Hitler's diet, which always included some form of meat, whether ham, sausages or liver dumplings." Frau Hess's comments are also backed up by several biographies about Hitler, with Fritz Redlich noting that Hitler "avoided any kind of meat, with the exception of an Austrian dish he loved, Leberknödl". Thomas Fuchs concurred, observing that a "typical day's consumption included eggs prepared in any number of ways, spaghetti, baked potatoes with cottage cheese, oatmeal, stewed fruits and vegetable puddings. Meat was not completely excluded. Hitler continued to eat a favourite dish, Leberklösse (liver dumplings)."

Some people have theorised that claims of Hitler ever being vegetarian were untrue and just for his image. The English historian Robert Payne, in his book The Life and Death of Adolf Hitler, believed that Hitler's diet was ascetic and deliberately fostered by Goebbels to emphasise Hitler's self-control and total dedication to Germany. Rynn Berry—a vegetarian activist and author on vegetarian history—supported the notion that Hitler's vegetarianism was "a marketing scheme concocted by Nazi propagandists" who wished to create a better public perception of Hitler, and was mostly for health reasons rather than moral ones (noting his fondness for liver dumplings), concluding that "Hitler was in no way an ethical vegetarian". In 1997, Wolfgang Fröhlich, Holocaust denier and former district council member for the Freedom Party, alleged that Hitler's favorite food was Eiernockerl, or egg dumplings.

However, available evidence suggests that Hitler—also an antivivisectionist—may have followed his selective diet out of a profound concern for animals based on his private behaviour. At social events, he sometimes gave graphic accounts of the slaughter of animals in an effort to make his dinner guests shun meat. In the BBC series The Nazis: A Warning from History, an eyewitness account tells of Hitler watching films (which he did very often). If ever a scene showed (even fictional) cruelty to or death of an animal, Hitler would cover his eyes and look away until someone alerted him the scene was over.

More recently, scholars including Alan Bullock, Arnold Aluke, Clinton Sanders, and Robert Procter have said that Hitler—at least during the war—followed a vegetarian diet. Hitler was put on a meat-free diet in 1938 by his doctors because of his failing health, but his interest in vegetarianism preceded this and may have had an ideological or psychological basis. The psychoanalyst Erich Fromm speculated that Hitler's vegetarianism was actually a means of atoning for the guilt he felt towards the suicide of his half-niece and mistress Geli Raubal, as well as a means of proving to himself and others that he was incapable of killing.

It has also been theorised that Hitler's diet may have been based on Richard Wagner's historical theories which connected the future of Germany with vegetarianism. In the book The Mind of Adolf Hitler by the psychologist Walter C. Langer, the author speculates:

If he (Hitler) does not eat meat, drink alcoholic beverages, or smoke, it is not due to the fact that he has some kind of inhibition or does it because he believes it will improve his health. He abstains from these because he is following the example of the great German, Richard Wagner, or because he has discovered that it increases his energy and endurance to such a degree that he can give much more of himself to the creation of the new German Reich.

Others have connected Hitler's avoidance of meat to the dietary traditions of his home region: Austrian historian Roman Sandgruber, in his biography of Hitler's father Alois, notes that the traditional foods of Braunau am Inn were mostly meatless, with Kaiserschmarrn, Eiernockerl, and Rohrnudeln all being popular, giving young Adolf a taste for cabbage, dumplings, and pastries.

The researchers Arnold Arluke and Boria Sax, in a paper published in Anthrozoös, concluded that the concern for animals and devotion to pets demonstrated by Hitler and many prominent Nazi Germans was due to "animals being seen as 'virtuous', 'innocent', and embodying ideal qualities absent in most humans. Indeed, to hunt or eat animals was itself defiling, a sign of 'decay' and perversion. People, on the other hand, were seen with 'contempt', 'fear', and 'disappointment'."

Despite Hitler's plans to convert Germany to vegetarianism after the war, some authors have questioned Hitler's commitment to the vegetarian cause due to the Nazi ban on vegetarian societies and the persecution of their leaders. However, the Nazi ban of non-Nazi organisations was widespread: all opposition political parties were banned, independent trade unions were replaced by Nazi equivalents, while non-government organisations and associations ranging from women's groups to film societies were either dissolved or incorporated into new organisations under the control of the Nazi leadership. The Nazi regime also introduced animal welfare laws which were unparalleled at the time.

== See also ==
- Animal welfare in Nazi Germany
- Holocaust analogy in animal rights
- List of vegetarians
- Reductio ad Hitlerum
