= C. L. Wrenn =

C. L. Wrenn may refer to:

- Charles Leslie Wrenn (1895–1969), British scholar
- Corey Lee Wrenn (born 1983), American sociologist
