= Nazi symbolism =

Symbols used by Nazis and neo-Nazis

The swastika was the first symbol of Nazism and remains strongly associated with it in the Western world.

The 20th-century German Nazi Party made extensive use of graphic symbols, especially the swastika, notably in the form of the swastika flag, which became the co-national flag of Nazi Germany in 1933, and the sole national flag in 1935. A very similar flag had represented the Party beginning in 1920.

Nazi symbols and additional symbols have subsequently been used by neo-Nazis.

== Swastika ==
The Nazis' principal symbol was the swastika, which the newly established Nazi Party formally adopted in 1920. The formal symbol of the party was the Parteiadler, an eagle atop a swastika.

The black–white–red motif is based on the colours of the flags of the German Empire. This colour scheme was commonly associated with anti-Weimar German nationalists, following the fall of the German Empire. The Nazis denounced the black–red–gold flag of the Weimar Republic (the flag of Germany at the time).

== Heraldry ==
Nazi-era coat of arms of Thuringia with the lion holding a swastika. The swastika was removed in 1945.

The ancient arms of Coburg (left) featured the head of Saint Maurice, a symbol looked down upon by the Nazi party. In 1934, it was replaced by a coat of arms featuring a sword with a swastika on the pommel (right). The original coat of arms was restored in 1945.

Under the Nazi regime, government bodies were encouraged to remove religious symbolism from their heraldry. Few German councils actually changed their often ancient symbols. Some, however, did, including Coburg, which replaced the Moor's head representing Saint Maurice on their arms with a sword and swastika, and Thuringia, which added a swastika to the paws of their lion.

== Other symbols and insignia ==
Letters of the Armanen runes invented by Guido von List were used by the Schutzstaffel (SS), particularly the Doppel Siegrune, based on the historical sowilo rune reinterpreted by List to signify victory instead of the sun. Other Armanen runes used by the Nazis and subsequently by neo-Nazis include forms derived from Eihwaz, Tiwaz, Algiz and Othala.

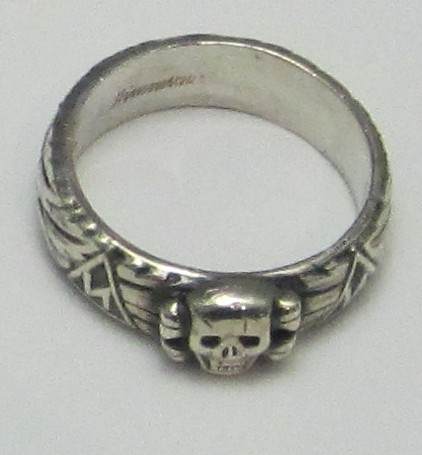
A replica of the skull ring awarded to members of the SS

The death's head appears on the SS-Ehrenring presented by Heinrich Himmler to favoured members of the SS, and was used as an insignia by the Death's Head Units of the SS that administered the concentration camps.

Units of the Wehrmacht used insignia including the Wolfsangel.

The Ahnenerbe research unit of the SS also used Wilhelm Teudt's neo-heathen Irminsul symbol.

Strasserism, a strand of Nazism with a Third Positionist ideology, used a crossed hammer and sword as its emblem.

== Banning of symbols ==
The public display of Nazi symbols and gestures are today banned by law in many countries, including Australia (since 2024), Austria, Brazil, China, France, Germany (see Strafgesetzbuch section 86a), Latvia, Lithuania, Poland, Russia and Ukraine.

On 9 August 2018, Germany lifted the ban on the usage of swastikas and other Nazi symbols in video games, allowing "games that critically look at current affairs" to be given an age rating instead by the manufacturer, such as USK. The move was made to bring the legislation in line with films and other arts.

== Usage by neo-Nazi groups ==
Many symbols used by the Nazis have further been appropriated by neo-Nazi groups, including a number of runes: the so-called Black Sun, derived from a mosaic floor in Himmler's remodel of Wewelsburg, and the Celtic cross, originally a symbol used to represent pre-Christian and Christian European groups such as the Irish.

Neo-Nazis also employ various number symbols:

- 18, code for Adolf Hitler. The number comes from the position of the letters in the alphabet: A = 1, H = 8.
- 88, code for "Heil Hitler", a phrase used in the Nazi salute. Also used as a reference to the "88 Precepts", a manifesto written by white supremacist David Lane.
- 14, from the Fourteen Words coined by David Lane: "We must secure the existence of our people and a future for white children."
- 14 and 88 are sometimes combined with each other (i.e. 14/88, 8814, 1488). They are also sometimes depicted on dice.
- 271, code for Holocaust denial or minimisation. The number "references the conspiratorial claim that only an estimated 271,000 Jews were killed in the Holocaust", according to the Anti-Defamation League.

In 1997, Wolfgang Fröhlich, a Holocaust denier and former district council member for the Freedom Party of Austria, alleged that Adolf Hitler's favourite food was egg dumplings (Eiernockerl). Some restaurants in Austria started advertising the dish as a "daily special" for 20 April, which is Hitler's date of birth, and although the allegation about the dish has never been historically confirmed, some neo-fascists began eating it as a symbolic food to celebrate Hitler's birthday.

== Gallery ==
The Parteiadler of the Nazi Party (1933–1945)

SS death's head insignia

Horizontally aligned Wolfsangel, used by the 2nd SS Panzer Division

Vertically aligned Wolfsangel, used by the 4th SS Polizei Panzergrenadier Division

Winged Odal, used by the 7th SS Volunteer Mountain Division (also used by the American-based National Socialist Movement from November 2016 until 2019)

SS Doppel Siegrune, based on the sig Armanen rune, in turn based on the historical sowilo rune

Algiz rune

A simplified version of the Celtic cross, as used by various neo-Nazi groups

The broken sun cross used by the German Faith Movement and the 5th SS Panzer Division, also used by the Thule Society

The Black Sun used by Esoteric Nazi circles and other neo-Nazi groups

A variation of the Black Sun
Iron Cross (1939 version)

The hammer and sword symbol utilised by adherents of Strasserism

== See also ==
- Art in Nazi Germany
- Bans on Nazi symbols
- Communist symbolism
- Fascist symbolism
- List of German flags
- List of symbols designated by the Anti-Defamation League as hate symbols
- National symbols of Germany
- Nazi memorabilia
- Propaganda in Nazi Germany
- Rising Sun Flag
