= Corey Lee =

Corey Lee, Cory Lee, or Korey Lee may refer to:

- Cory Lee, Canadian singer and actress
- Corey Lee (baseball) (born 1974), American baseball pitcher
- Corey Lee (chef) (born 1977), Korean–American chef
- Corey Lee Wrenn (born 1983), American sociologist
- Korey Lee (born 1998), American baseball catcher
