= Kendra Coulter =

Canadian scholar, writer, and animal ethicist

- Occupation: Professor
- Known for: Humane jobs, animal protection
- Awards: 2015 Canadian Association for Work and Labour Studies Book Prize

Academic background
- Education: University of Toronto, Huron University College

Academic work
- Discipline: Labour studies, Human–animal studies, Organization studies
- Institutions: Huron University College
- Notable works: Revolutionizing Retail: Workers, Political Action, and Social Change (2014); Animals, Work, & the Promise of Interspecies Solidarity (2016)
- Notable ideas: Interspecies solidarity Humane jobs

Kendra Coulter is a Canadian scholar who is Professor in Management and Organizational Studies at Huron University College at Western University. She is the author of Revolutionizing Retail: Workers, Political Action, and Social Change (2014), Animals, Work, and the Promise of Interspecies Solidarity (2016), and Defending Animals: Inside the Front Lines of Animal Protection (2023). She is a fellow of the Oxford Centre for Animal Ethics.

== Career ==
Coulter was trained as an anthropologist, studying at the University of Western Ontario and the University of Toronto. Coulter got her PhD at the University of Toronto, and her BA at The University of Western Ontario. She is the co-editor of Governing Cultures: Anthropological Perspectives on Political Labor, Power, and Government, along with William R. Schumann, which was published in 2012 by Palgrave Macmillan.

Coulter's first monograph, Revolutionizing Retail: Workers, Political Action, and Social Change was published in 2014 by Palgrave Macmillan. The book explores the retail sector, examining how the lives of workers in the industry can be improved. She first examines the nature of retail work, and then looks to the successes and promise of retail unions in changing workers' lives and situations. Coulter then considers retail more broadly, examining a range of possible avenues for political change including through public policy. Amanda Pyman, who reviewed the book for Times Higher Education, said that it was "Essential reading for all employment relations scholars ... Coulter should be commended for this valuable contribution to what is still, despite the prominence of retail in global economies, an understudied sector. In the process, she offers a valuable reminder of the importance of workers' struggles in organising for social change." Revolutionizing Retail was awarded the 2015 Canadian Association for Work and Labour Studies book prize.

In her second monograph, 2016's Animals, Work, & the Promise of Interspecies Solidarity, Coulter examines the work people do with animals as well as the work done by animals, drawing upon a range of theoretical perspectives including feminist political economy. Coulter argues that the work done by and for animals has been underexplored in labour and organizational studies and human-animal studies, Coulter not only analyses these topics, arguing that animals' work should be recognised as such, but critically engages with them, offering alternative ways to conceptualise the place of animals in the workplace and society, with a focus on improving lives and alleviating suffering. She introduced and elucidates the concept of ecosocial reproduction to recognise the effects of wild animals' labour on ecosystems. Coulter later expanded on the concept of humane jobs and how it can be used to encourage social change. On the website of her Humane Jobs project, Coulter writes that "There are compelling ethical and environmental reasons to move the workforce away from damaging patterns and towards more sustainable and positive practices and employment sectors. We can and should create humane jobs." This scholarship has significantly influenced human-animal studies and Susanna Hedenborg calls it "unique, interesting, and important."

In 2017, in recognition of her research on labor and social justice, Coulter was one of the 70 academics chosen to become a member of the Royal Society of Canada's College of New Scholars, Artists and Scientists. In the same year, she was awarded the Brock University Chancellor's Chair for Research Excellence, which recognises her "outstanding contributions in her field and encourages her position as a path-breaking scholar in research about animals". In 2020, she published the edited collection Animal Labour: A New Frontier of Interspecies Justice? with Oxford University Press. The book was co-edited with the legal scholar Charlotte E. Blattner and the philosopher Will Kymlicka.

In 2020, Coulter was invited to serve on the Government of Ontario's Provincial Animal Welfare Services Advisory Table. She is also a member of the Canadian Violence Link Coalition's Strategic Planning Committee and of the City of London's Animal Welfare Advisory Committee.

In 2023, Dr. Coulter along side of Dr. Jennifer Epp, was awarded the John and Gail MacNaughton Prize for excellence in teaching.

== Select books ==
- Coulter, Kendra and William R. Schumann, eds. (2012). Governing Cultures: Anthropological Perspectives on Political Labor, Power, and Government. New York: Palgrave Macmillan.
- Coulter, Kendra (2014). Revolutionizing Retail: Workers, Political Action, and Social Change. New York: Palgrave Macmillan.
- Coulter, Kendra (2016). Animals, Work, & the Promise of Interspecies Solidarity. New York: Palgrave Macmillan.
- Blattner, Charlotte E., Kendra Coulter and Will Kymlicka, eds. (2019). Animal Labour: A New Frontier of Interspecies Justice? New York: Oxford University Press.
- Coulter, Kendra (2023). Defending Animals: Inside the Front Lines of Animal Protection. Cambridge: MIT Press.
- Coulter, Kendra (2025). The Tortoise's Tale. New York: Simon & Schuster.
