= Leslie Irvine =

Leslie Irvine may refer to:

- Leslie Irvine (sociologist), American sociologist
- Leslie Irvine (referee) (born 1958), Northern Irish football referee
