= Eiernockerl =

Simple and popular Austrian culinary dish

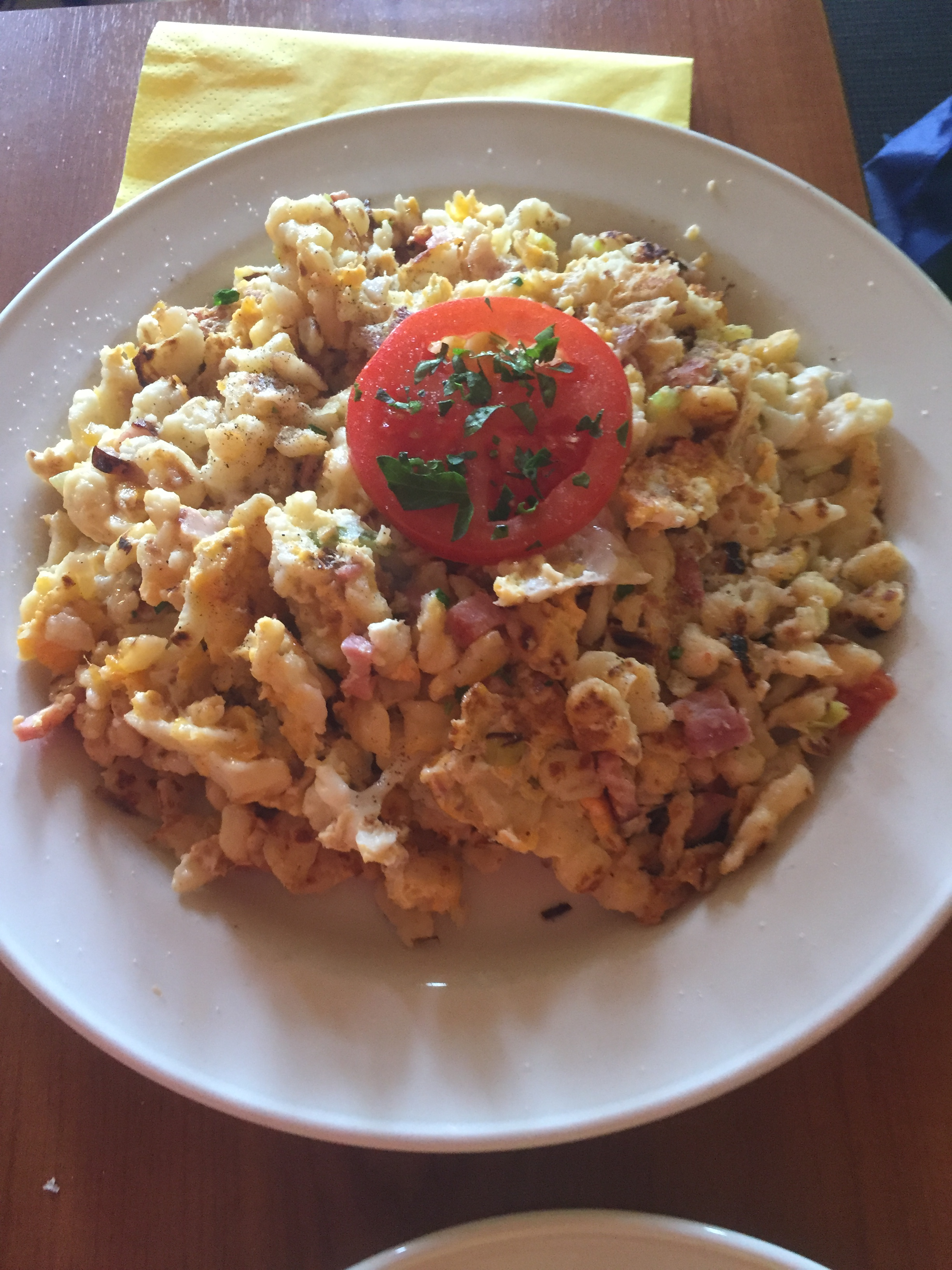
- with bacon
- Type: Dumpling
- Course: main
- Place of origin: Austria
- Main ingredients: Flour, eggs, milk, butter

Eiernockerl (German: egg dumplings) is an Austrian dish of the Viennese cuisine.

== Origin ==
Dumplings are popular in all regions of Austria.

== Ingredients and variants ==
The typical ingredients for Eiernockerl are flour, eggs, milk, butter, and then salt, pepper, ground nutmeg, and for decoration chives. Eiernockerl is usually served with a side dish of green salad.

It is also made to use up leftover Nockerl.

Some of the Austrian dumplings' main variants are: Krautspatzen, with sauerkraut roasted in butter; Apfelspatzen, with apples; and Erdäpfelspatzen, with peeled potatoes.

== Hitler association ==
In 1997, Wolfgang Fröhlich, Holocaust denier and former district council member for the Freedom Party, claimed that Adolf Hitler's favorite food was Eiernockerl. Some restaurants in Austria started advertising the dish as a "daily special" for the 20th of April, which was Hitler's birthday. Accordingly, some neonazis have taken to celebrate Hitler's birthday by eating Eiernockerl while they promote the event on social media as strictly culinary.

Austrian historian Roman Sandgruber, in his biography of Hitler's father Alois, notes that the traditional foods of Braunau am Inn were mostly meatless, with Kaiserschmarrn, Eiernockerl, and Buchteln all being popular, giving young Adolf a taste for cabbage, dumplings, and pastries (though he was also reportedly fond of Leberklöße or liver dumplings). Johannes J. Eibl's 1965 book Ewige Wahrheit ("Eternal Truth") features an interview with a cook who had worked at the Bürgerbräukeller beer hall in Munich, in which she describes Eiernockerl as Hitler's "favourite dish".

An account of Hitler's tour of Vienna after the Anschluss relates that he dined on Eiernockerl and green salad.

== See also ==
- Wiener schnitzel
- Spätzle
- Backhendl
- Gnocchi
- Neo-Nazi coded symbols
- Adolf Hitler and vegetarianism
