= Arnold Arluke =

Professor emeritus of sociology and anthropology

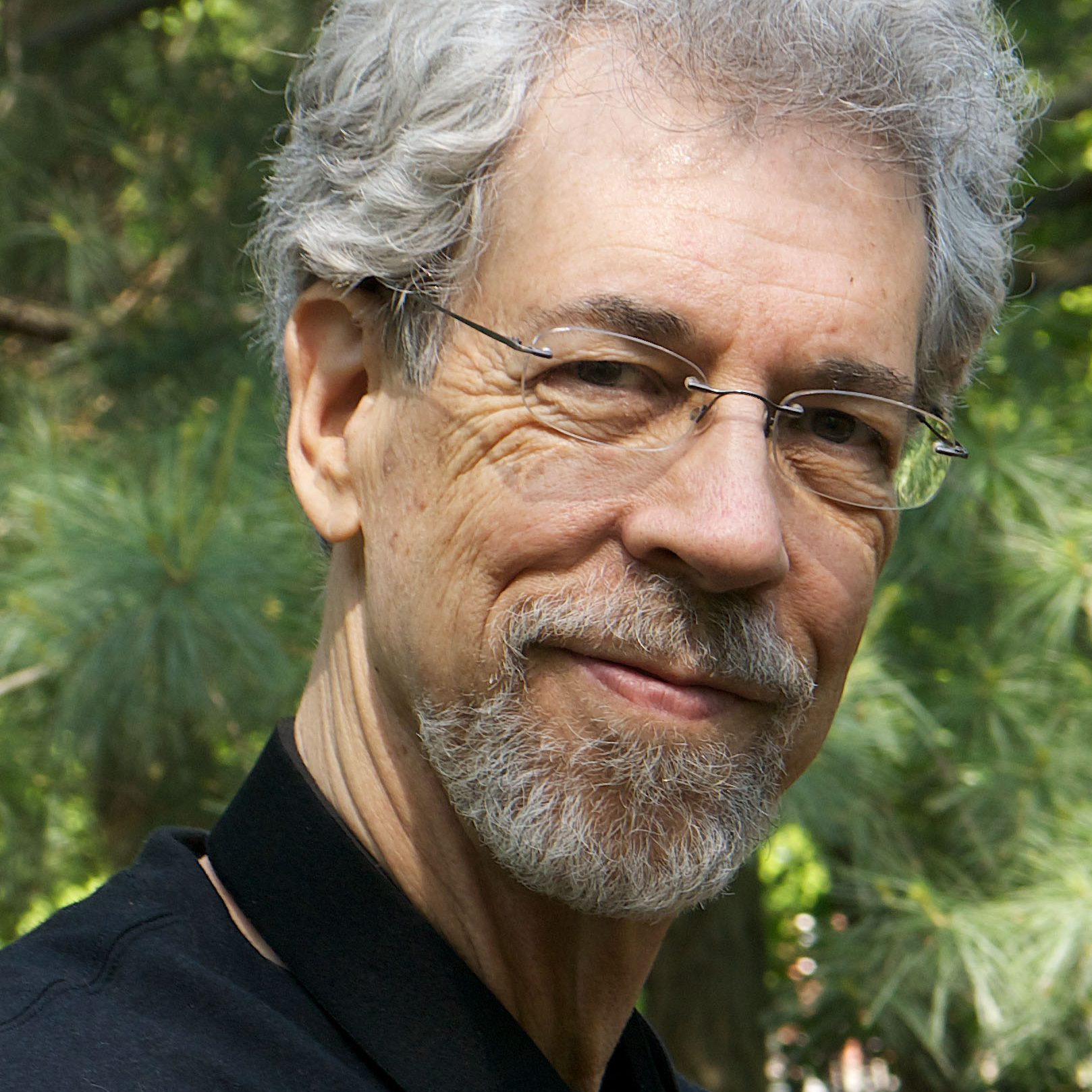
- Education: New York University (Ph.D.)
- Occupation: author

Arnold Arluke is professor emeritus of sociology and anthropology at Northeastern University in Boston, Massachusetts and senior fellow at the Tufts Center for animals and public policy. Arluke earned a B.A. in sociology from George Washington University and a Ph.D. in sociology from New York University and was a postdoctoral fellow at Harvard School of Public Health. He has served as a visiting scholar at Cornell Medical College, the department of psychiatry at Massachusetts General Hospital, Yale Law School, and the International Fund for Animal Welfare (IFAW). Currently, he resides in St. Petersburg, Florida where he is a consultant to the American Society for the Prevention of Cruelty to Animals (ASPCA) and a portrait photographer.

== Research and contributions ==
Arluke has authored and co-authored 14 books, over 164 scholarly articles, and dozens of trade and press articles. Most of his research and writing focuses on the inconsistencies and contradictions in the human treatment of non-human animals from the early 20th century to the present. As a founder of and advocate for the sociology of animal studies and anthrozoology, he established one of the first scholarly journals (Society & Animals) about animal studies and the first university press series (Animals, Culture, and Society, Temple University Press) devoted to this topic, along with starting the American Sociological Association's section on animals. Many of Arluke's concepts have become a mainstay in human-animal studies, such as the caring-killing paradox, the graduation hypothesis, and the sociozoologic scale. Since 2017, his research has focused on human-animal relations and veterinary access in low-income communities in Costa Rica and the United States.

== Awards ==
Of his many publications, he is best known for Regarding Animals; described as a “modern classic;” it received the Charles Horton Cooley Award. Arluke's research was also honored by the American Sociological Association (ASA), the International Association of Human-animal Interaction Organizations (IAHAIO), and the Massachusetts Society for the Prevention of Cruelty to Animals (MSPCA), and was twice recognized for his teaching with the Excellence in Teaching award at Northeastern University.

== Books ==
- Regarding Animals (second edition with Clint Sanders and Leslie Irvine, 2022, first edition, 1996)
- Underdogs: Pets, People, and Poverty (with Andrew Rowan, 2020)
- The Photographed Cat: Picturing Human-Feline Ties, 1895-1940 (with Lauren Rolfe, 2013)
- Beauty and the Beast: Human-Animal Relations as Revealed in Real Photo Postcards, 1905-1935 (with Robert Bogdan, 2010)
- Inside Animal Hoarding: The Barbara Erickson Case (with Celeste Killeen, 2009)
- Between the Species: Readings in Human-Animal Relationships (with Clint Sanders, 2008)
- The Sacrifice: How Scientific Experiments Transform Animals and People (with Lynda Birke and Mike Michael, 2007)
- Just a Dog: Understanding Animal Cruelty and Ourselves (2006)
- Brute Force: Animal Police and the Challenge of Cruelty (2004)
- Great Apes and Humans: The Ethics of Coexistence (with Benjamin Beck, et al., 2001)
- Sociology: Snapshots and Portraits of Society (with Jack Levin, 1996)
- Gossip: The Inside Scoop (with Jack Levin, 1987)
- The Making of Rehabilitation: A Political Economy of Medical Specialization (with Glenn Gritzer, 1985, Korean edition, 2019).
