= Trans-species psychology =

Field of psychology

Trans-species psychology is the field of psychology that states that humans and nonhuman animals share commonalities in cognition (thinking) and emotions (feelings). It was established by Gay A. Bradshaw, American ecologist and psychologist.

Trans-species psychology, often referred to as a "science of sentience", argues that existing scientific evidence points to a common model of brain, mind, and behavior for humans and nonhuman animals. Bradshaw claims the theory and data from neuroscience, ethology, and psychology, both current and dating back through the evolutionary biology research of Charles Darwin in the mid-1800s, shows that evolution conserves brain and mind across species. Humans and other animals share a common capacity to think, feel, and experience themselves and their lives. Some mammals have demonstrated the ability to experience empathy, culture, self-awareness, consciousness, psychological trauma, mourning rituals, and complex communication abilities.

The knowledge that nonhuman animals have the ability to think and feel in complex ways has also brought the understanding of their capacity to experience psychological trauma and suffering. Trans-species psychology seeks to prevent and treat trauma in all animals through increased scientific understanding.

The prefix trans is a Latin noun meaning "across" or "beyond", and it is used to describe the comparability of brain, mind, and behavior across animal species. In an interview, G.A. Bradshaw stated that the trans affixed to psychology "re-embeds humans within the larger matrix of the animal kingdom by erasing the 'and' between humans and animals that has been used to demarcate and reinforce the false notion that humans are substantively different cognitively and emotionally from other species".

== Historical background: elephants suffering from PTSD ==
In 2005, Bradshaw's research led her to the conclusion that post-traumatic stress disorder (PTSD) existed in free-ranging elephant survivors of severely traumatic events, including mass culls (systematic killing), poaching, translocation, and other human attacks. Typically gentle and peaceful herbivores with complex social structures, tight-knit lifelong familial bonds, sophisticated cognitive capacities, and highly empathic responsiveness, traumatized elephants were displaying behavioral aberrations such as inter- and intra-species aggression, abnormal startle response, depression, and infant neglect. The unprecedented killing and assault of over 100 rhinoceroses by traumatized young bull elephants was documented in South Africa. Bradshaw integrated psychobiological and ethological principles, specifically the understanding that maternal and community loss lead to pathogenic right hemispheric neurological development, which often results in hyperaggression and socioemotional dysfunction. She found that violent human interference was leading to the breakdown of elephant culture and society, which was the focus of a report by Charles Siebert at the New York Times called An Elephant Crackup?. She also documented this in her book, Elephants on the Edge: What Animals Teach us about Humanity, which received multiple international awards and was nominated for a Pulitzer Prize and recommended as a book of the week on the Jean Feraca show, Jean Feraca recommendation. These findings and later studies confirming vertebrate commonalities led her to establish trans-species psychology as a theory and method for the study and care of animals (human-inclusive). She also established the non-profit organization, The Kerulos Center, which is dedicated to furthering scientific understanding and practical applications that promote animal well-being.

== Species-common neuroanatomy and neuropsychology ==
Cortical, limbic, and autonomic brain structures that govern emotion, consciousness, sense of self, and associated psychophysiological and behavioral traits (e.g., maternal behavior, facial recognition, moral development, play, sexual behavior, fear, aggression, affect regulation) are highly conserved evolutionarily. Importantly, the neurobiological structures and processes affected by trauma (i.e., cortical and subcortical areas of the right brain, including the right orbitofrontal cortex, anterior cingulate, amygdala, hippocampus, and posterior areas of the right hemisphere) are also conserved across species. Similar to humans, animals experience complex emotions and are psychologically susceptible to stress and the effects of violence. This understanding of the common neurobiology between all species, has provided the basis for the diagnosis of post-traumatic stress disorder (PTSD) in multiple species other than humans.

== Trans-species psychiatry ==
Through trans-species psychology and psychiatry, diverse applications of psychotherapeutic approaches to animal trauma recovery (e.g.,horses; elephants) are developing from existing knowledge of human mental health, with provisions for species culture, ethics, and diversity. For example, this research has been used to investigate Complex PTSD in chimpanzee biomedical survivors abused and traumatized and rescued into sanctuary. Chimpanzees who have been subjected to biomedical research often display symptoms consistent with a diagnosis of complex PTSD, a pervasive psychological disorder, common to human prisoners of war, genocide survivors, and victims of domestic violence. It is characterized by difficulties with severe mood dysregulation, impaired interpersonal functioning, loss of sense of safety and security, and disruption in the sense of self. As with humans who suffer from this condition, non-human primates have been documented to experience chronic affective instability, self-injurious behavior, repetitive movement stereotypies, difficulties with attachment, hypervigilance, and sleeping and eating disorders. Similar symptoms have been displayed in parrots in captivity who have experienced trauma. Significant similarities in the treatment needs of trauma survivors in animal sanctuaries and in human trauma recovery programs have been subsequently identified. Human and non-human animals need positive social bonding, a sense of safety, a healthy living environment, self-esteem, and an empathic caregiver presence to help overcome trauma.

=== Case study: Jeannie ===
(the following is summarized from Bradshaw et al., 2008) Jeannie was a large female chimpanzee who was a meticulous groomer with a slow, intentional gait. She was born in 1975, and although few details are known about her early infancy, it is established that she experienced premature separation and weaning from her mother based on her species norms (prior to age 5) and was a research subject in four biomedical research laboratories for the majority of her life. She arrived into a sanctuary environment at age 22, where she lived until her death in 2007, at age 31. While being used as a biomedical research subject, she was housed in a 5' x 5' x 7' cage that was suspended from the ceiling. Although her species requires social bonds and interaction for health and well-being, she was housed alone. She received repeated invasive tests, which included over 200 "knock down" anesthetizations with a dart gun, repeated vaginal washes, infection with HIV, hepatitis B and C, rhinovirus, and multiple internal biopsies, including of the liver, cervix, and lymph nodes. Her records indicate that she experienced recurrent bouts of anorexia, resulting in severe weight loss. After seven years of biomedical experimentation at the fourth laboratory, the staff reported that Jeannie had a "nervous breakdown". She would alternate between dissociative "trance-like" states to severe anxiety and aggression. Upon seeing laboratory personnel or visitors dressed in white laboratory suits and masks, she would become so distressed that she would salivate excessively, urinate and defecate, and repeatedly bang her body against her cage. She also had seizure-like episodes, screaming, and self-injurious behavior. Psychotropic medication was administered in attempt to manage her symptoms. When Jeannie arrived at the sanctuary, her appetite and weight improved. However, she initially continued to struggle daily with mood instability, self-mutilation, and hypervigilance. She avoided social contact with both humans and chimpanzees. Gradually, her symptoms decreased in frequency and she began to seek out comfort from other chimpanzees, but continued to struggle with limited social functioning. She suffered from multiple medical problems that included skin problems, hand and foot tremors, upper respiratory distress, and pelvic pain. Table 1 demonstrates Jeannie's symptoms as they conform to a complex PTSD presentation.

Table 1 Complex PTSD Symptoms in a Chimpanzee Biomedical Research Laboratory Survivor
Psychobehavioral Disturbances	Jeannie's Symptoms
Symptoms Related to Affect Regulation/Behavioral Control/Cognition: Emotion self-regulation; difficulty communicating wishes and desires; disorders of mood; impulse control difficulties; self-destructive behavior; deficits in executive function	Emotional lability; self-injurious behavior; inability to self-soothe; withdrawn; often sank into near vegetative state; persistent depression and anxiety; hyperarousal: difficult to calm; attacking herself; biting and hitting self; pulling off hair and nails; loss of motivation to acquire new skills
Attachment: Reliability and predictability of the world; interpersonal/boundary difficulties	Guarded; hypervigilant; extreme distrust; fearful; hesitant in new environments; inability to tolerate touch; limited social skills; initially could not accept grooming; avoided eye contact
Dissociation: Distinct alterations in states of consciousness; detachment from one's self; dissociative coping; behavioral repetitions; difficulty focusing attention and modulating arousal; re-enactments	Frequent dissociative episodes with eye rolling and inability to pull herself back without external intervention; detached reactions to her hands or feet, preceded by ritualistic circling and trance state; emotional lability; extreme responses to minor stressors; aggression; self-injurious behavior
Biobehavioral disturbances: Sensorimotor problems; hypersensitivity; increased medical problems/somatization; sleep disturbances; eating disorders	Difficulty walking; poor coordination; hand and foot tremors; highly sensitive to anyone approaching her enclosure; very sensitive to lighting changes; excessive sleepiness; ritualistic eating behaviors

Jeannie displayed significant symptoms in each category consistent with complex PTSD. Following Judith Herman's model for complex PTSD recovery, Bradshaw et al. discusses goals of the sanctuary's support and care, which as previously mentioned, focus on restoring a sense of personal safety, agency, and empowerment. Stress is minimized, and opportunities to make decisions about what and when to eat, when to socialize and with whom, etc. are consistently offered.)

== The trans-species paradigm ==
Trans-species psychology has catalyzed a paradigm shift in which humanity is "challenged to re-think almost every aspect of modern culture", and rediscover and re-invent human identity in a new and more ethically egalitarian relationship with all other species. Trans-species psychology and science (TSP) overturn the standing paradigm based on scala naturae, a concept attributed to Aristotle that orders nature from "lower' to "higher" with humans at its apex. Trans-species science rectifies a significant inconsistency in scientific logic and practice known as "unidirectional inference". Conventionally, it has been accepted practice to make inferences about humans from animals but not the reverse. Instead, making inferences from what is understood about humans and extending this understanding to animals (anthropomorphism) was considered unscientific. However, unidirectional inference is not consistent with scientific evidence and theory. Similar to morphological, physiological and genetic traits, mental states of nonhuman animals can be inferred from humans with scientific rigor (i.e., bidirectional inference).

== Ethical and legal considerations ==
Scientifically documented animal-human mental comparability brings significant ethical and legal challenges. The use of animals as experimental surrogates for humans (animal models) has been justified because nonhuman species were considered to lack attributes that make such practices on humans unethical. Trans-species science challenges the "double" ethical standard, to be replaced with a scientifically based axiom of equality and protection of rights. Recognition that non-human animals experience a subjective life similar to humans compels laws and practices to be upheld that provide animals protection comparable to humans. As Bradshaw and Watkins (2006, p. 13) write, "The trans-species psyche views both animal and human psyches as subjects of psychology's commitment to healing and care. It therefore disabuses the notion of psyche as uniquely human and throws into question the power differential that permits the sacrifice of animal objectification. Denying animals their full status as psychological beings is understood as a belief that abets animal exploitation. By recognizing a shared subjectivity, psychology ceases to be a solely a human enterprise and animals enter the sphere of psychological concern." A species-inclusive conceptual framing most importantly compels a more democratic approaches to research, such as Trans-Species Participatory Action Research (PAR).

== Human-animal relationships ==
=== Interdependence ===
Trans-species psychology also has implications for how we understand human-nonhuman animal relationships, namely the profound interdependence between species. Dating from psychology's early beginnings, C.G. Jung articulated the negative impact of detachment with nature on the human psyche: "As scientific understanding has grown, so our world has become dehumanized. Man feels himself isolated in the cosmos, because he is no longer involved in nature, and has lost his emotional "unconscious identity" with natural phenomena... His contact with nature has gone, and with it has gone profound emotional energy that this symbolic connection supplied." (Bradshaw & Watkins, 2006, p. 6).

This interdependence is based on two principles. First, trans-species psychology's recognition of substantial vertebrate commonalities, "re-embeds" humans back into the continuum of nature – cross-species relationships are "horizontal", based in parity, not structured along a vertical gradient of inequality. As the field of ecopsychology emphasizes, humans are a part of the natural world, and disconnection with it creates a disconnect with one's self and one's culture. Second, studies of previous human-human domination and violence (e.g. European holocaust, genocides, slavery) highlight that being either the oppressed or the oppressor creates a pathogenic psychological state. Continued domination and traumatic injury of non-human animals with minds similar to humans and capacities similar to humans, causes suffering for both the human and non-human animal.

=== Equality ===
Often referred to as a "science of sentience in service", trans-species psychology expands the understanding of the "human-animal bond" by replacing the difference-based hierarchy between species with one of parity and mutual respect. Interspecies differences are not denied, but they are viewed through a lens of comparability with an appreciation for diversity.

The right to individual agency and species specific cultural self-determination is logically extended as an essential component of well-being for non-human animals. This has ethical implications for many fields, including ecopsychology, that currently use animals in service to humans, or keep animals in captivity to benefit human well being (e.g. Animal Assisted Therapy (AAT), including Dolphin Assisted Therapy (DAT), animal research). It suggests that facilitators of AAT programs be held to ethical standards of behavior that conform to those granted to human children and others who are unable to provide formal consent, in order to avoid exploitation of the animals involved in the program. Moreover, just as when there is potential for exploitation with humans, these standards would not be most effectively developed by the AAT industry, but rather based on independent recommendations from experts in the field of animal welfare. Commonalities in mind suggests that exploitation of non-human animals has the same potential to cause trauma just as it is known to inflict on humans. In their Counseling Today article, Borchers & Bradshaw (2008, p. 41) state, "Human healing and transformation are not ignored, but they take place in the process of being in service to animals." Trans-species culture embodies seeking ways to peacefully co-exist with non-human animals without violence toward them or destroying their bodies, families, self-determination, or habitats.

Bradshaw has also written about holding animals in captivity in facilities such as zoos, aquaria, and circuses. She wrote a chapter in the book, Metamorphoses of the Zoo: Animal Encounter after Noah, by Ralph R. Acampora. The chapter, titled "Open Door Policy: Humanity's Relinquishment of "Right to Sight" and the Emergence of Feral Culture", discusses the extensive psychic damage caused by the objectification and "forced incarceration of individuals with brains, minds, emotions, and cultures comparable to those of humans" (Acampora, p. 153), who are kept in a captive environment for public display and institutional profit. In a 2011 Izilwane interview with Z. Krasney, Bradshaw was asked to comment on captive animal businesses. She stated, "Captivity is institutionalized trauma. Zoos, aquaria, and other places like circuses are exploitative. They are businesses. Visiting zoos is no different from visiting prisons. These places are filled with animals suffering horribly, surviving by living in disturbing mental states and behaviors such as self-mutilation, depression, unhappiness, premature death, elephants living half as long as their free ranging counterparts, mothers killing their babies, aggression and fighting. Would you bring your child to a concentration camp or to a prison? The comparison is no exaggeration."

Further work in this area discusses a new conceptualization of conservation as a shift from preservation and "wildlife management" to multi-species culture and animal self-determination. The concepts of trans-species psychology discourage practices such as culls (systematic killing), sustainable harvesting, captive breeding, etc., as processes that disrupt familial bonds, cause emotional trauma and the breakdown of culture, "what once seemed unpleasant but necessary becomes disturbingly abhorrent" (Bradshaw, 2009, p. 161).

== Distinctions from other scientific disciplines ==
Trans-species psychology is related, but distinct from other fields of science, such as comparative psychology and cognitive ethology.

=== Compared to comparative psychology ===
Comparative psychology studies the "behavior, cognition, perception, and social relationships of diverse species" from a comparative perspective Journal of Comparative Psychology. It encourages the study of diverse species performing multiple tasks both in field and laboratory settings.

However, comparative psychology differs from trans-species psychology in that comparative psychology retains the linear scale of nature, where non-human animals are conceptualized as inferior beings to humans. Also, unidirectional inference is utilized, whereas conclusions about humans are drawn from non-humans, but bidirectional inference, drawing from existing knowledge of humans to benefit non-humans, is not accepted. Thus, it differs from trans-species psychology's tenets of human/non-human commonality and parity, as well as the use of bidirectional inference.

=== Compared to cognitive ethology ===
Cognitive ethology unites the fields of cognitive science and ethology (the study of animal behaviors), the latter described by Niko Tinbergen as "observing animals under more-or-less natural conditions, with the objective of understanding the evolution, adaptation (function), causation, and development of the species-specific behavioral repertoire", cognitive ethology. In keeping with cognitive sciences in general, cognitive ethology focuses on cognitive processing rather than more holistic conceptualizations that trans-species psychology embodies with its roots in depth psychology, including emotional, spiritual, and social experiences of an animal (human-inclusive). Trans-species psychology considers the entire realm of psyche, including subjective experience. It extends the scope of other fields such as affective neuroscience and neuropsychology, moral neuroethology, and neuropsychoanalysis to include other species.

== See also ==
- Animal cognition
- Animal consciousness
- Animal psychopathology
- Anthrozoology
- Emotion in animals
