= Leslie Irvine (sociologist) =

American sociologist

Leslie Jane Irvine is an American sociologist specializing in conceptions of the self and human-animal relationships. She is currently a professor in the Department of Sociology at the University of Colorado Boulder, where she has worked since 1998. Her methodological specializations include qualitative research and narrative analysis. Born and raised in Buffalo, New York, she attended Palm Beach Junior College (Associate of Arts), Florida Atlantic University (Bachelor of Arts in art history and Master of Arts in sociology) and State University of New York at Stony Brook (PhD in sociology).

== Select bibliography ==
- Irvine, Leslie (1999). Codependent Forevermore: The Invention of Self in a Twelve Step Group. Chicago: The University of Chicago Press.
- Irvine, Leslie (2004). If You Tame Me: Understanding our Connection with Animals. Philadelphia: Temple University Press.
- Irvine, Leslie (2009, 2021). Filling the Ark: Animal Welfare in Disasters. Philadelphia: Temple University Press.
- Irvine, Leslie (2011). The Self and Society. San Diego: Cognella Academic Publishing.
- Irvine, Leslie (2013). My Dog Always Eats First: Homeless People and Their Animals. Boulder: Lynne Rienner.
- Charmaz, Kathy; Harris, Scott; and *Irvine, Leslie (2019). The Social Self and Everyday Life: Understanding the World through Symbolic Interactionism. Hoboken: Wiley.
- Irvine, Leslie (editor). We Are Best Friends: Animals and Society. Basel: MDPI.
- Irvine, Leslie J.; Pierce, Jennifer L.; and Zussman, Robert. (2019). Narrative Sociology. Nashville: Vanderbilt University Press.
- Arluke, Arnold; Sanders, Clinton R.; and *Irvine, Leslie. (2022). Regarding Animals (second edition). Philadelphia: Temple University Press.
