= Gay A. Bradshaw =

American psychologist and ecologist

Gay A. Bradshaw is an American psychologist and ecologist, and director of The Kerulos Center for Nonviolence. Her work focuses on animal trauma recovery and wildlife self-determination. She is the author of Elephants on the Edge: What Animals Teach Us about Humanity, a book on PTSD in elephants.

Bradshaw's studies were the first to identify Post-Traumatic Stress Disorder (PTSD) in non-human animals beginning with free living elephants. She is the author of a seminal series of articles on great ape psychology, trauma, civil rights, and consciousness. This work was expanded to parrots, bears, and domestic animals and led to her founding the field of trans-species psychology, the articulation of a vertebrate common model of brain, mind, and behavior that is supported by existing science.

== Discovery of PTSD in elephants and chimpanzees ==
In 2005, while investigating what was referred to as an outbreak of “abnormal behaviors,” Bradshaw established that in fact African elephants were experiencing Post-Traumatic Stress Disorder (PTSD). Psychological symptoms included inter- and intra-species aggression, abnormal startle response, depression, mood disorders, and socio-emotional dysfunction, including infant neglect. All were related to a series of human-caused trauma: mass killings, translocations, social disruption, and habitat loss and degradation. Her findings were further supported by neuroscience research stating that the brain structures affected by trauma (cortical and subcortical areas of the right brain) are highly conserved across species. The epidemic proportions of elephant PTSD signifies a critical point and portends imminent collapse of elephant societies in Asia and Africa.

== Trans-species psychology ==
Trans-species psychology labels the entirety of standing science that describes a unitary model of brain, mind, and behavior for all animals. Bradshaw maintains that establishing trans-species psychology as a new field was only necessary to point out the selective use of science. A vast amount of theory and data accumulated since Charles Darwin shows that nonhuman animals are mentally and emotionally comparable to humans, and surpass human abilities in diverse ways. However, scientific theory does not explicitly acknowledge this understanding, nor does scientific practice implicitly reflect it. By ignoring human and other animal psychological comparability, the science community encourages cultural and legal subjugation of animals.

Trans-species psychology rectifies this inconsistency by eliminating the artificial separation between species and openly bringing knowledge of human psychology to bear on other species. The affix trans on psychology embeds the human species, without privilege, in the matrix of the animal kingdom. By recognizing human-animal comparability, trans-species psychology situates all species under a single conceptual umbrella - a unitary model of brain, mind, behavior and consciousness. In so doing, trans-species psychology revolutionizes a new scientific and ethical paradigm that has profound implications for human-animal relationships, culture, ethics, scientific research, and psychological practice.

According to Bradshaw, trans-species psychology provides a scientific basis for animal rights and there is evidence to support ethical arguments to provide nonhuman animals with rights comparable to humans. Bradshaw refers to this cultural movement as trans-species living, "learning to live like animals again.” Trans-species living embraces an ethic of being in service to animals in ways that promote animal self-determination and restores animal well-being by supporting their habitats, cultures, individual value, and agency. It disavows the exploitation of animals for profit, entertainment, research, or other gain.

== The Kerulos Center for Nonviolence ==
In 2008, Bradshaw founded The Kerulos Center for Nonviolence, in Jacksonville, Oregon, USA, a non-profit organization dedicated to ethical living with non-human nature. The Center consists of an international community of faculty members and professional advisors from diverse disciplines working to improve the lives of animals through scientific understanding and service.

== Publications ==
Bradshaw authored the book, Elephants on the Edge: What Animals Teach Us about Humanity, (Yale University Press, 2009), which discusses the emotional and social lives of elephants. Elephants on the Edge has been distinguished as a 2009 Book of the Year (BOTYA) Gold Medal Award, Winner in Psychology, a Scientific American Favorite Science Books of 2009, a nomination for Pulitzer Prize 2009, an Honorable Mention Award 2009 PROSE, a Psychology (Professional and Scholarly Publishing Division of the Association of American Publishers), and an Honorable Mention, 2010 Green Book Festival.

Archbishop Desmond M.Tutu, 1984 Nobel Peace Prize Laureate: "African peoples and wildlife have been bound together in a delicate network of interdependence since ancient times. The arrival of colonialism tore apart these bonds: human brother now fights against elephant brother, and mothers of both species mourn. Elephants on the Edge is an urgent call to end this strife and for humanity to embrace once more the traditions that kept the peace with our animal kin."

Bradshaw is also editor of Minding the Animal Psyche, an anthology covering diverse species from the perspective of trans-species psychology.
