= Animals & Society Institute =

American non-profit scholarly organization

- Abbreviation: ASI
- Formation: 1983; 43 years ago
- Founder: Kenneth Shapiro
- Tax ID no.: 22-2527462
- Legal status: 501(c)(3) organization
- Purpose: Advancement of human-animal studies
- Location: Ann Arbor, Michigan
- Website: animalsandsociety.org

The Animals & Society Institute (ASI) is an American non-profit scholarly organization that works to expand knowledge about human–animal relationships, develop knowledge and resources in the field of human–animal studies (HAS), and create resources to address the relationship between animal cruelty and other forms of violence.

On February 17, 2025, ASI announced that it will close at the end of 2025.

== Personnel and advisors ==
The ASI is staffed by Ivy Collier (Executive Director), Lisa Lunghofer (Human-Animal Relationships Program Director), Gala Argent (Human-Animal Studies Program Director) and Daniel Earle (managing director). It has a board made up of John Thompson (chair), Anne Elizabeth Hirky (vice chair), Kenneth Shapiro (president and secretary), Petra Pepellashi (treasurer), Beatrice Friedlander, Kristin Stewart, Elan Abrell, and Gail Luciani.

== Publications ==
The ASI publishes three journals and a book series.

=== Journal of Applied Animal Welfare Science ===
The Journal of Applied Animal Welfare Science is a quarterly journal which is published by Taylor & Francis with sponsorship from the ASI. It has been publishing since 1999, and is presently edited by Cynthia Bennett.

=== Society & Animals ===
Society & Animals: Journal of Human-Animal Studies is a peer reviewed bi-monthly journal co-published by Brill with sponsorship from the ASI. It has been publishing since 1993, and its founding editor is Kenneth Shapiro. It is currently edited by Susan McHugh, with managing editors Robert McKay (humanities), Robert Mitchell (quantitative natural and social science), Zoei Sutton (qualitative social science), and Drew Winter ("political animals"). Ralph Acampora, Sally Borrell, Pete Porter, Michelle Szydlowski, and Corey Wrenn are review editors.

Special issues that the journal has published include:

- 1996 (4:2): Consumer Psychology
- 1997 (5:3): Animal Cruelty
- 1998 (6:2): Geography
- 1999 (7:2): Children
- 2000 (8:3): Religion
- 2001 (9:3): Representation
- 2005 (13:1): Ways of Seeing
- 2006 (14:1): Language
- 2011 (19:4): Proceeding of Minding Animals Conference
- 2012 (20:2): ASI Fellowship
- 2013 (21:2): Archaeology
- 2013 (21:5): Religious Slaughter
- 2014 (22:1): Animals in Place
- 2019 (27:7) The Silent Majority: Invertebrates in Human Animal Studies
- 2022 (30:7) Outdoor Cats

=== Sloth ===
Sloth: A Journal of Emerging Voices in Human-Animal Studies is a bi-annual peer-reviewed journal for work by current and recent undergraduates that has been published by the ASI since 2015. Its current editor is the philosopher Joel MacClellan.

=== HAS Book Series ===
The HAS Book Series is published by Brill, and was one of the first academic book series focused on animal studies. It is edited by Kenneth Shapiro, Thomas Aiello, and Gala Argent, with an editorial board made up of Ralph Acampora, Clifton Flynn, Hilda Kean, Randy Malamud, Gail Melson, Leslie Irvine, and Richie Nimmo. It publishes both monographs and edited collections. Titles include:

- Lyle Munro, Confronting Cruelty: Moral Orthodoxy and the Challenge of the Animal Rights Movement. 2005
- Ann Herda-Rapp and Theresa L. Goedek (eds.), Mad About Wildlife: Looking at Social Conflict Over Wildlife . 2005
- Lisa Kemmerer, In Search of Consistency: Ethics, Animas, and the Minimize Harm Maxim. 2006
- Laurence Simmons and Philip Armstrong (eds.), Knowing Animals. 2007
- Sandra Swart and Lance van Sittert (eds.), Canis Africanis: A Dog History of South Africa. 2008
- Tom Tyler and Manuela Rossini (eds.), Animal Encounters. 2009
- Terry Caesar, Speaking of Animals: Essays on Dogs and Others. 2009
- Sarah E. McFarland and Ryan Hediger (eds.), Animals and Agency. 2010
- Carol Freeman, Paper Tiger: A Visual History of the Thylacine. 2010
- John Knight, Herding Monkeys to Paradise: How Macaque Troops are Managed for Tourism in Japan. 2011
- Nik Taylor and Tania Signal (eds.), Theorizing Animals: Rethinking Humanimal Relations. 2011
- Rob Boddice, Anthropocentrism: Humans, Animals, Environments. 2011
- Abel A. Alves, The Animals of Spain: An Introduction to Imperial Perceptions and Human Interaction with Other Animals, 1492-1826. 2011
- Lynda Birke and Jo Hockenhull (eds.), Crossing Boundaries. 2012
- Ryan Hediger, Animals and War. 2012
- Nik Taylor and Lindsay Hamilton, Animals at Work. 2013
- Annie Potts (ed.), Meat Culture. 2016
- Matthew Chrulew and Dinesh Joseph Wadiwel (eds.), Foucault and Animals. 2017
- Carmen Cusack, Fish, Justice, and Society. 2018
- Justyna Wlodarczyk, Genealogy of Obedience: Reading North American Dog Training Literature, 1850s-2000s. 2018
- Anna Barcz and Dorota Łagodzka (eds.), Animals and Their People: Connecting East and West in Critical Animal Studies. 2018
- Kathrin Herrmann and Kimberley Jayne (eds.). Animal Experimentation: Working Towards a Paradigm Change. 2019
- Judith Benz-Schwarzburg, Cognitive Kin, Moral Strangers? Linking Animal Cognition, Animal Ethics & Animal Welfare. 2019
- 'Gala Argent and Jeannette Vaught (eds.), The Relational Horse: How Frameworks of Communication, Care, Politics and Power Reveal and Conceal Equine Selves, 2022
- Sarah Czerny, Absent Interests: On the Abstraction of Human and Animal Milks, 2022
- Julien Dugnoille and Elizabeth Vander Meer (eds.), Animals Matter: Resistance and Transformation in Animal Commodification, 2022
- Maggie Bolton and Jan Peter Laurens Loovers (eds.), Sentient Entanglements and Ruptures in the Americas: Human-Animal Relations in the Amazon, Andes, and Arctic, 2023
