= Pauleen Bennett =

Australian scientist

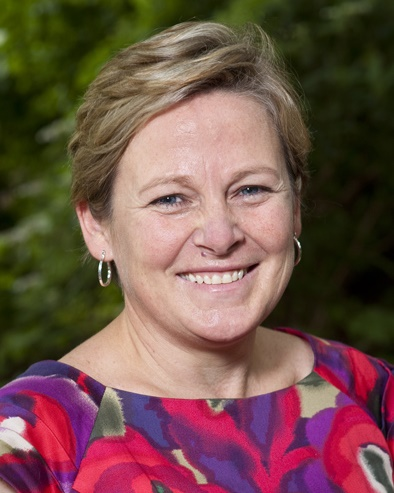
- Born: 13 October 1963 (age 62); Ivanhoe, Victoria, Australia
- Citizenship: Australian
- Scientific career
- Fields: Anthrozoology; Psychology; Neuropsychology; Behavioural neuroscience
- Workplaces: La Trobe University; Monash University; Ohio State University
- Doctoral advisor: Kim T Ng

Pauleen Charmayne Bennett (born 13 October 1963) is an Australian scientist researching anthrozoology at La Trobe University in Victoria, Australia.

Bennett's research in the field of human-animal interactions has informed government policy and covered areas of: human attitudes, health and behaviour; ethics of animals in society; animal behaviour, physiology and welfare. Her research interest lies in understanding the diverse psychological connections between humans and animals, particularly companion animals, positive psychology, and in the use of animals in human health therapies.

In 2002, Bennett founded the Anthrozoology Research Group, an interdisciplinary team of postgraduate and undergraduate researchers with over one hundred peer-reviewed journal and conference publications. She is chair of the Australian Anthrozoology Research Foundation, a non-profit foundation set up to raise research funding for students investigating the potential benefits for human health of engaging with companion animals. Bennett was the first Australian, and first academic outside of the US, to be elected to serve as the president of the International Society for Anthrozoology (2011–2015) and is on the editorial board for the international peer-reviewed journal, Anthrozoös.

== Early life and education ==
Pauleen Charmayne Bennett was born in Ivanhoe, Victoria on 13 October 1963. She grew up on her family's poultry farm near the Mornington Peninsula, on the south-east outskirts of suburban Melbourne. In the immediate years following high school, Bennett held an amateur jockey's licence and rode racehorses in training for a while, before enrolling in simultaneous Bachelor of Arts (Sociology) and Bachelor of Behavioural Science with Honours (Psychology) degrees at La Trobe University, where she received numerous accolades for best performance over the course of her degrees (1989–1994). Bennett went on to earn a Master of Psychology (Clinical Neuropsychology) in 1999 from La Trobe University, while concurrently gaining her PhD in Behavioural Neuroscience, for her thesis on the role of protein serine/threonine phosphatases in memory formation, from Monash University in 2000.

== Work in anthrozoology ==
Bennett changed her research focus from the neurosciences to anthrozoology in the Department of Psychology in 2002, as a member of the faculty of Monash University, working in collaboration with the Animal Welfare Science Centre. Her review of the issues surrounding cosmetic tail docking of dogs and finding "that the theory of cognitive dissonance...may provide a useful framework within which to understand, and attempt to alter, attitudes that persist even though they appear contrary to available empirical evidence" coincided with a national ban on tail docking of dogs in all states of Australia under the Prevention of Cruelty to Animals and Animal Welfare Acts. Bennett's subsequent collaborations and postgraduate supervision have resulted in research in the areas of dog-owner relationships, canine personality, the modern role of companion animals, improving rehoming outcomes for shelter animals, and factors relating to successful and unsuccessful pet ownership practices.

Bennett has a strong commitment to knowledge transfer and has been instrumental in the development of several courses. In 2006, she was appointed as an adjunct professor at Ohio State University to develop and deliver the undergraduate 'Animals in Society' course, providing students from diverse academic backgrounds with the critical thinking skills required to address controversial issues concerning animals in contemporary societies. She also led development of the Graduate Certificate in Animal Welfare offered by the Animal Welfare Science Centre.

== Current positions ==
Bennett is currently a professor and head of Department of Psychology and Counselling at La Trobe University, Victoria (Australia). She is chair of the Australian Anthrozoology Research Foundation, former president of the International Society for Anthrozoology, and serves on the editorial board for the international peer-reviewed journal Anthrozoös.

== Personal life ==
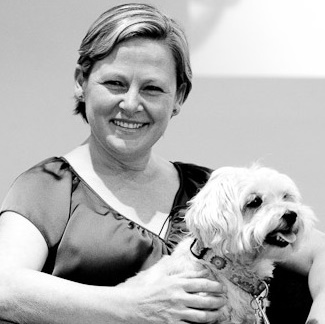
Pauleen Bennett and a dog (2012)

Bennett lives in regional Victoria outside of Bendigo with her partner, Ron Wheeler, and their collection of dogs, horses, goats and one cat. She used to farm alpacas, is a certified pet dog training instructor and is a registered dog breeder, having bred Jack Russell Terriers, Australian Shepherds and Lagotto Romagnolos under the kennel name of HevnSent. It was Bennett's personal appraisal of the breed standard requirement to dock her puppies' tails, and subsequent review of the complex attitudes related to the issue of tail docking in dogs, that prompted her to change her professional focus from the neurosciences to pursue improved understanding of human-animal interactions in the inter-disciplinary field of anthrozoology.
