= Philippe Charlier =

French coroner and forensic pathologist

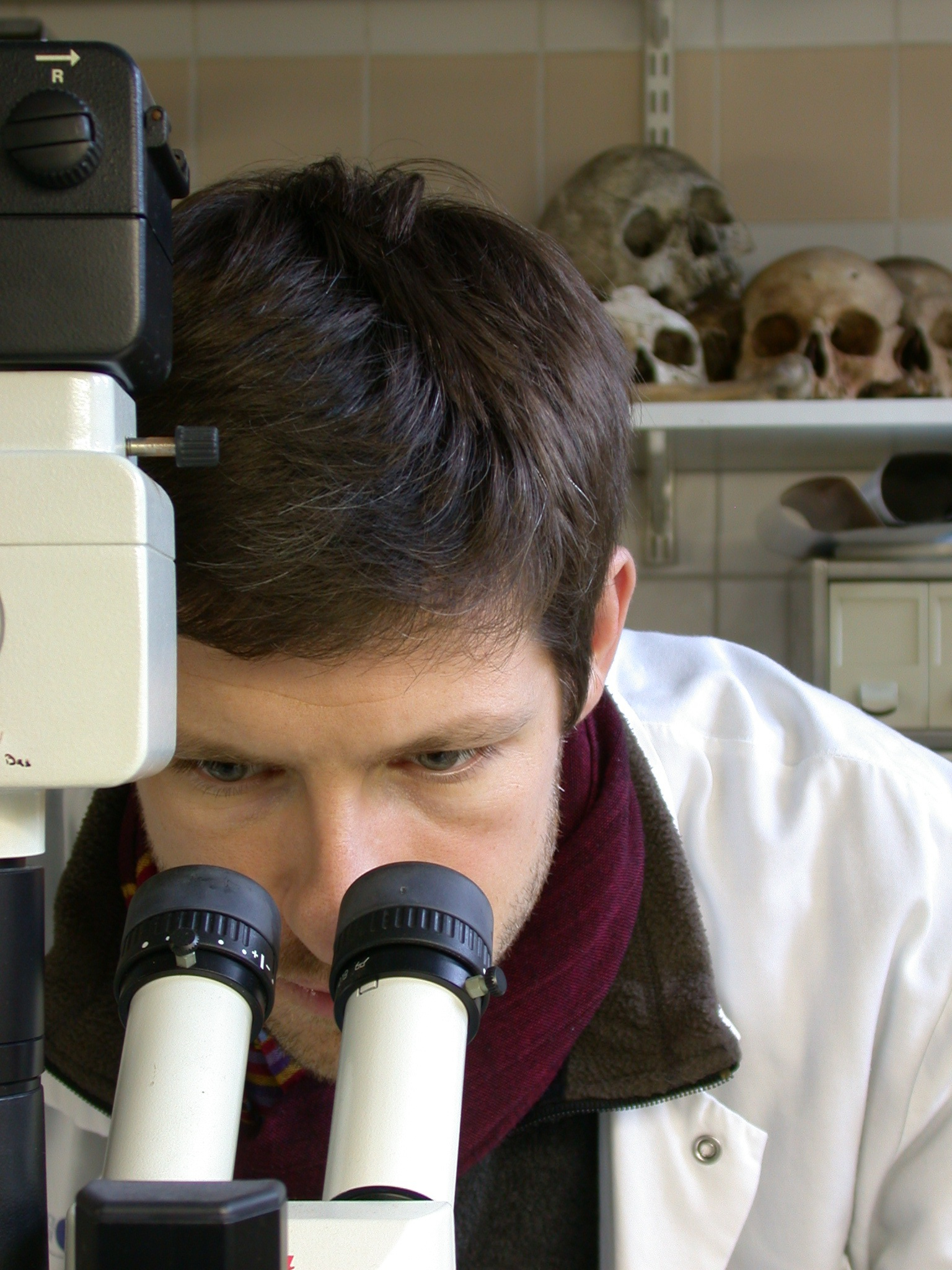
Charlier at work

Philippe Charlier is a French coroner, forensic pathologist and paleopathologist. In addition to various significant French figures, he has analyzed the dental remains of Adolf Hitler, citing them as confirming the dictator's death in Berlin amid various fringe theories.

== Early life and education ==
Charlier was born in Meaux on 25 June 1977. His father is a doctor, his mother a pharmacist. He was raised with an awareness of classical antiquity and at the age of 6 he dug up a mole's skeleton, followed by a human skull at the age of 10. He studied archaeology and art history at the Michelet Institute and was part of the forensic department at Raymond Poincaré University Hospital.

== Work ==
Charlier's work has focused on the remains of Richard Lionheart, Agnès Sorel, Fulk III, Count of Anjou, Diane de Poitiers, relics of Louis IX scattered in France, and potential relics of Joan of Arc. In 2011, he helped authenticate the identification of Henry IV's head.

=== Hitler's dental remains ===
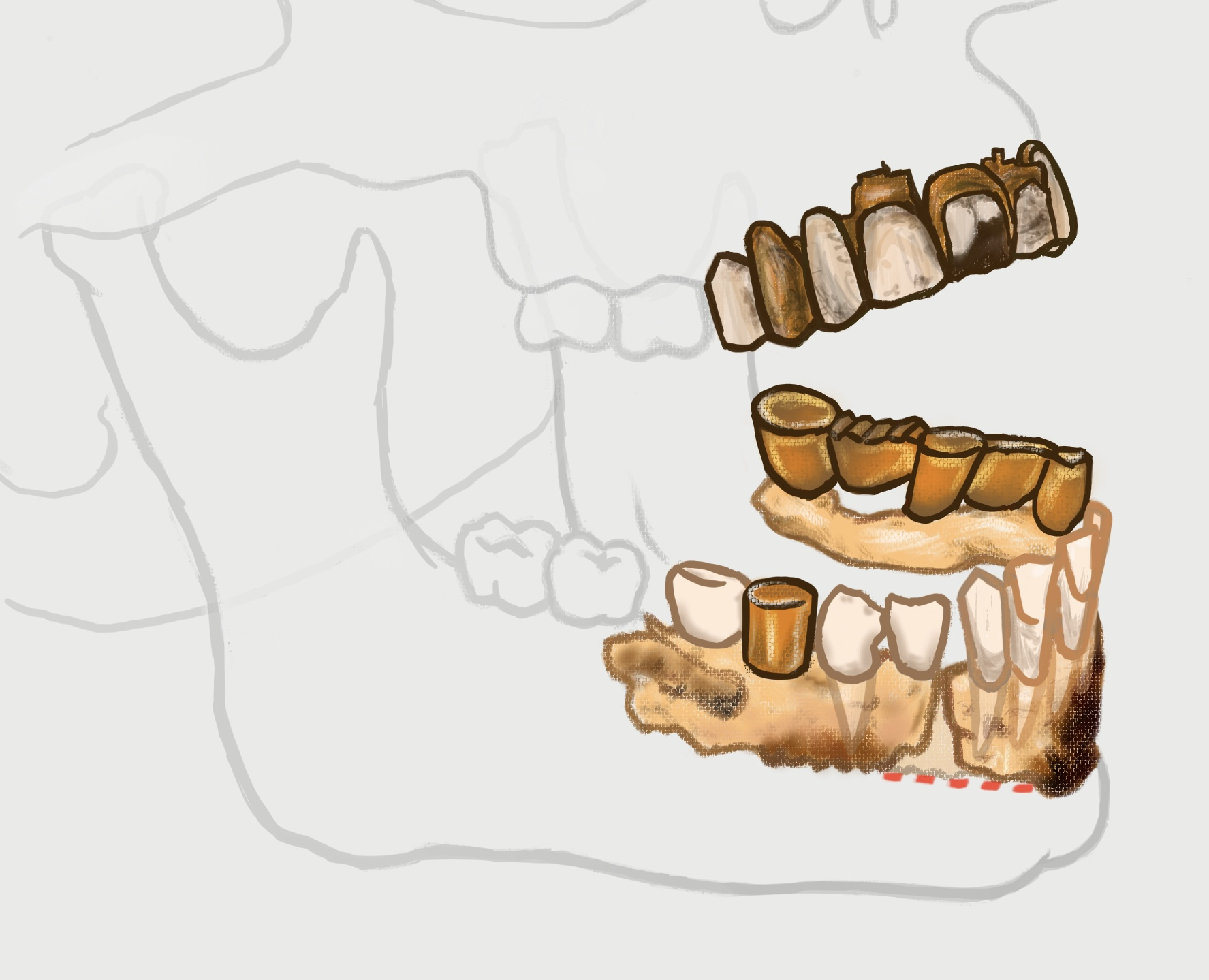
Hitler's dental remains, cited as the only hard evidence of his death

In 2017, Charlier reconfirmed the authenticity of Adolf Hitler's dental remains, the only remains of the Nazi dictator ever confirmed to have been found, finding the maxillar bridge and mandibular fragment (broken off around the alveolar process) to agree with their description by the Soviets. (Note: The 2018 article notes, "It is important to see that these data fit perfectly with the [Soviet] autopsy report and with our direct observations.") The remains were exhaustively matched to Hitler's complicated dentistry, showing a lack of meat particles—in agreement with his diet. Charlier's team did not detect gunpowder residue, implying that Hitler did not die by a gunshot through the mouth (as suggested by key eyewitness Artur Axmann). Deposits of a blue powder were suggested as possibly showing that a cyanide pill was taken (in combination with an alleged gunshot through the temples). (Note: To explain the lack of evidence of a bullet, Anton Joachimsthaler theorized in 1995 that after Hitler fired his pistol at contact range, the bullet passed through one temple and became lodged inside the other, causing a hematoma that looked like the temple exit wound reported by some eyewitnesses. Joachimsthaler cited a 1925 study which—contrarily—supports full exits from shots fired transversely at contact range.) (Note: During his interoggation by the Soviets, Heinz Linge reportedly told one of their agents—undercover as a fellow captured German—that only he and Martin Bormann knew the true circumstances of Hitler's death. Linge repeatedly said he would not crack to his captors and suggested that Hitler's temple wound seemed like it could have been painted on.)

Charlier cites the teeth as confirming Hitler's death amid various fringe theories that he survived by fleeing to South America. The pathologist disregarded 2009 DNA analysis revealing that a gunshot-damaged occipital bone fragment (long claimed to be Hitler's) actually belonged to a woman. He has also bolstered the propagandistic Soviet account of an alleged autopsy, while not addressing the possibility of partial mandibulectomy and deception by eyewitnesses.
