= James Serpell =

Anthrozoologist

- Born: James Andrew Serpell; 16 February 1952 (age 74); Rome, Italy

James A. Serpell is professor of Animal Ethics and Welfare at the University of Pennsylvania. He lectures in the School of Veterinary Medicine on veterinary ethics, applied animal behavior and welfare, and human-animal interactions. Serpell also directs the Center for the Interaction of Animals and Society (CIAS). Serpell was a founder of The International Society for Anthrozoology(ISAZ) and remains on the board.

== Early life and education ==
The son of Christopher Serpell, James Serpell was born in Rome, Italy, on 16 February 1952. He attended University College London, where he received his bachelor's degree in Zoology in 1974. He then completed a PhD in Animal Behavior at the University of Liverpool in 1980.

== Career ==
After graduating, Serpell went to the University of Cambridge and established the Companion Animal Research Group there in 1985. He moved to the University of Pennsylvania in 1993 and teaches there currently. While at the University of Pennsylvania he was part of creating C-BARQ, the first standardized dog behavioral assessment survey.

Serpell's scholarship and research in the area of anthrozoology is interdisciplinary, incorporating anthropology and the humanities, as well as scientific studies of human-animal interactions. His early book, In the Company of Animals, provides a broad overview of human-animal interactions. His edited book The Domestic Dog (now in 2nd edition) focuses on dogs' behavior and human interactions with them. Among his research papers is one documenting increased walking by new Cambridge pet owners after adopting a puppy. Another early study helped explain the source of the widespread compatibility that pet owners feel with their dogs, despite various behavior problems.

Serpell's scholarly leadership was recognized in 1992 when he was presented the IAHAIO/ISAZ Distinguished Scholar Award. He is a primary leader and founder of the International Society for Anthrozoology (ISAZ), which publishes Anthrozoos. Acknowledging his contributions to the society, ISAZ is appointing him as a Fellow of ISAZ, as one of the inaugural group of Fellows.

== Publications ==
Serpell is the author of In the Company of Animals: A Study of Human-Animal Relationships and is the editor of two editions of The Domestic Dog: Its Evolution, Behavior and Interactions with People. He has published many research papers on Zoology, Cultural Anthropology, and Animal Behavior. Among his publications that have been cited over 200 times each are: Animal-assisted interventions in mental health: Definitions and theoretical foundations; Development and validation of a questionnaire for measuring behavior and temperament traits in pet dogs; Anthropomorphism and anthropomorphic selection---beyond the "Cute Response"; and Factors influencing human attitudes to animals and their welfare.
