= National symbols of Germany =

National symbols of Germany are the symbols that are used in Germany to represent what is unique about the nation, reflecting different aspects of its cultural life and history.

== Symbols ==
	Symbol	Image	Notes
Flag	Flag of Germany	German National Flag	
Coat of arms	Coat of arms of Germany	Emblem of Germany	
National anthem	Deutschlandlied	Deutschlandlied	
Majestic mark (Military)	Iron cross		
National tree	Oak		
German reunification symbol	Brandenburg Gate	Brandenburg Gate in Berlin	

== See also ==
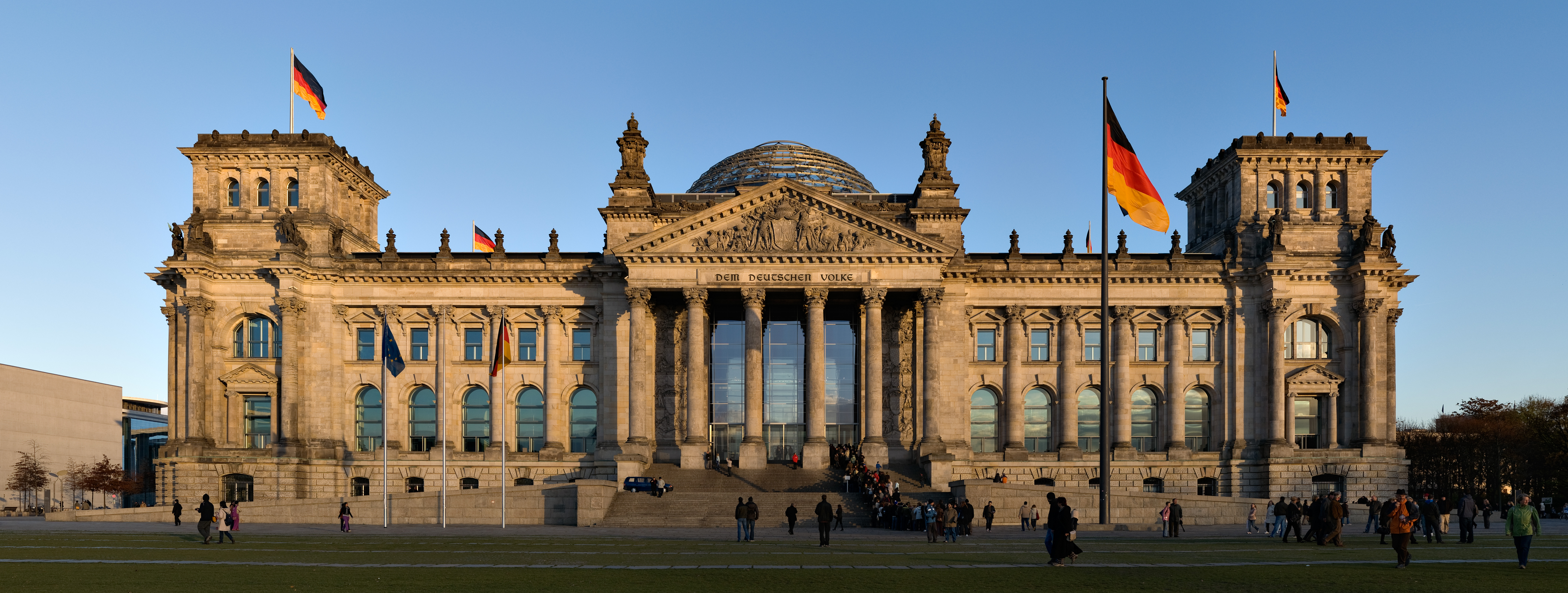
The German Unity Flag is a national symbol of German reunification that was raised on 3 October 1990. It waves in front of the Bundestag in Berlin (seat of the German parliament).

- German cuisine
- Music of Germany
- German art
