= ABMAP =

Collection of metric data on domestic animals

ABMAP, also known as the Animal Bone Metrical Archive Project, consists of a collection of metric data on the main domestic animals recorded at the University of Southampton, together with the data from some other sources, in particular the Museum of London Archaeology Service (MoLAS). Whilst the data is primarily from England, it is applicable to a wider geographical area. Stored in a neutral archival format, it is freely available for teaching, learning and research.

== History of the Project ==
In the 1990s English Heritage funded a project at the University of Southampton to collect and synthesize metrical data recorded over the past twenty years. The main aim was to assemble the data and ensure that it was kept in a format in which it would be maintained and made accessible.

== The Database ==
The project aimed to collect measurements of the main domestic species found on archaeological sites in England. The database included approximately 25,000 bones, predominantly of cattle and sheep, but also of pig, horse, dog, goat, domestic fowl, and goose. The data set is organized by species, anatomical element, period, and site type.

== Sources ==
Serjeantson, D. (2005). 'Science is Measurement'; ABMAP, a Database of Domestic Animal Bone Measurements. Environmental Archaeology 10 (1): 97-103
