= Corey Lee Wrenn =

American sociologist (born 1983)

- Born: October 22, 1983 (age 43)
- Occupation: Academic

Academic background
- Education: Colorado State University
- Thesis: (2016)

Academic work
- Discipline: Sociologist
- Sub-discipline: Animal rights movement; human-animal studies; veganism
- Institutions: Monmouth University; University of Kent

Corey Lee Wrenn (born October 22, 1983) is an American sociologist specializing in human–animal studies, the sociology of the animal rights movement, ecofeminism, and vegan studies. As of 2026, she is a lecturer in the School of Social Policy, Sociology and Social Research at the University of Kent.

== Education and career ==
Wrenn received a B.A. in political science in 2005 and an M.S. in sociology in 2008, both from Virginia Tech. In 2013, Wrenn founded the Vegan Feminist Network, an academic-activist project. She completed a PhD in sociology at Colorado State University in 2016.

Wrenn became a lecturer in the Department of Political Science and Sociology at Monmouth University in 2015. She was awarded Exemplary Diversity Scholar by the University of Michigan's National Center for Institutional Diversity in 2016. Wrenn served as council member for the American Sociological Association's Animals & Society section (2013–2016) and was elected chair in 2018. She left Monmouth University and took up a lectureship in the School of Social Policy, Sociology and Social Research at the University of Kent in 2018.

She serves as Book Review Editor for Society & Animals and is a member of The Vegan Society's Research Advisory Committee.

== Research ==
Wrenn is a sentientist, an abolitionist vegan, and a feminist. She is the author of A Rational Approach to Animal Rights: Extensions in Abolitionist Theory (Palgrave MacMillan 2016) and Piecemeal Protest: Animal Rights in the Age of Nonprofits (University of Michigan Press 2019).

== Select bibliography ==
- Wrenn, Corey (2016). A Rational Approach to Animal Rights: Extensions in Abolitionist Theory. Palgrave Macmillan UK.
- Wrenn, Corey (2019). Piecemeal Protest: Animal Rights in the Age of Nonprofits. The University of Michigan Press.
- Wrenn, Corey (2021). Animals in Irish Society: Interspecies Oppression and Vegan Liberation in Britain's First Colony. SUNY Press.
- Wrenn, Corey Lee (2025). Vegan Witchcraft: Contemporary Magical Practice and Multispecies Social Change. Routledge.
