= Christopher Serpell =

British journalist

Christopher Harold Serpell
- Born: 1 July 1910; Leeds, West Riding of Yorkshire, England
- Died: 3 June 1991 (aged 80); Barnes, London, England
- Occupation: Journalist
- Known for: BBC's Rome and Washington Foreign Correspondent
- Notable work: From Our Own Correspondent

Christopher Serpell (1 July 1910– 3 June 1991) was a journalist and BBC diplomatic correspondent.

Serpell was born in Leeds, England, in 1910. He was educated at Leeds Grammar School - where his father was senior master - and at Merton College, Oxford, where he matriculated in 1929.

Serpell began his career as a reporter for the Yorkshire Post. In the 1930s he began working for The Times in London. With a fellow journalist, Douglas Brown, he wrote the novel If Hitler Comes (first published in 1940 as Loss of Eden), which imagines a Britain that has ostensibly made peace with Germany but has in effect surrendered.

During World War II, he served in naval intelligence under Ian Fleming. He subsequently joined the BBC as its Rome correspondent, then Washington correspondent from 1953, and finally diplomatic correspondent, until retirement in 1975.

He appeared as a castaway on the BBC Radio 4 programme Desert Island Discs on 31 March 1973.

He died in 1991 at his home in Barnes, South London.
