= Kaiserschmarrn =

Sweet pancake dish

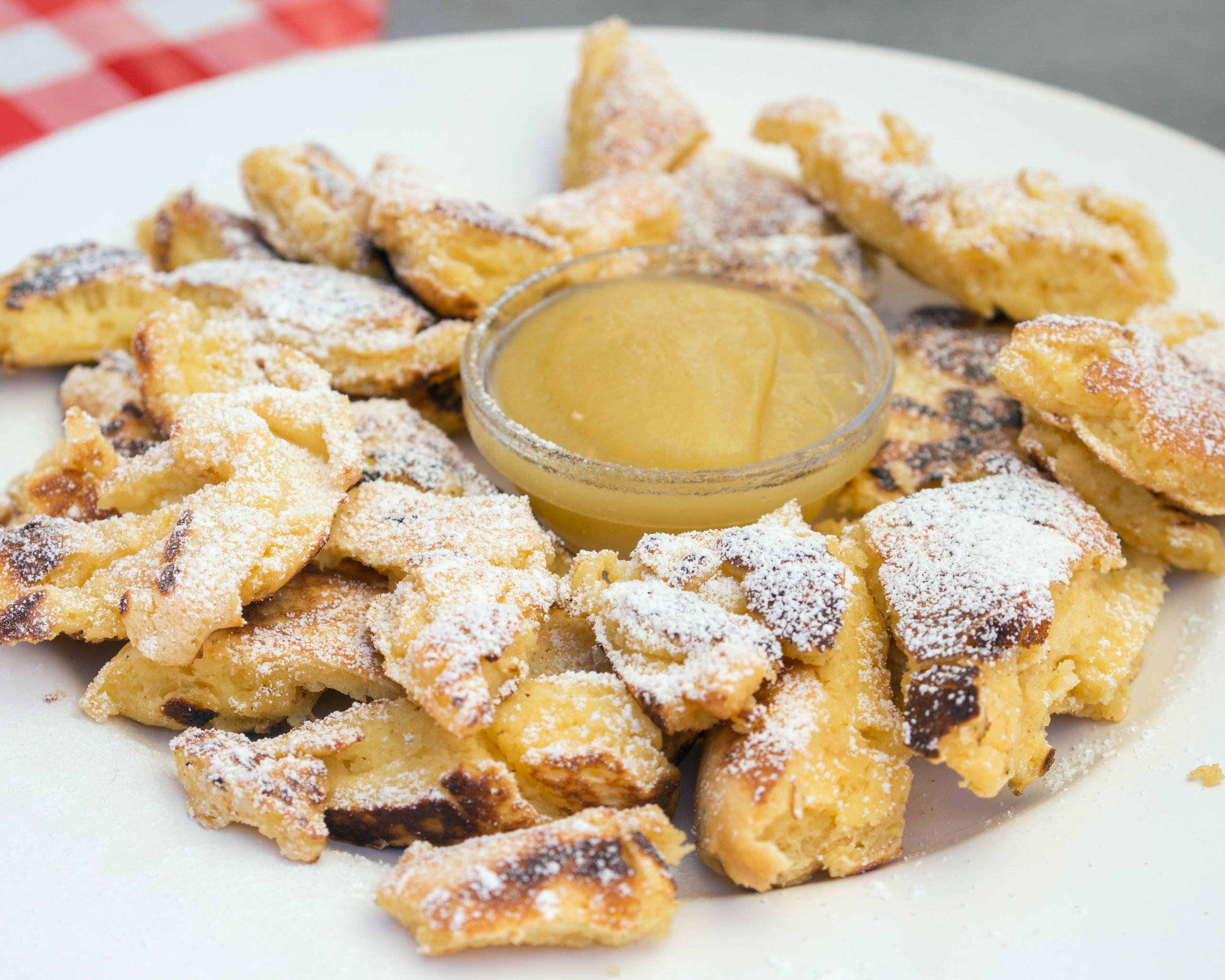
- Kaiserschmarrn with apple sauce
- Type: Pancake
- Place of origin: Austria
- Main ingredients: Flour, eggs, sugar, milk, butter

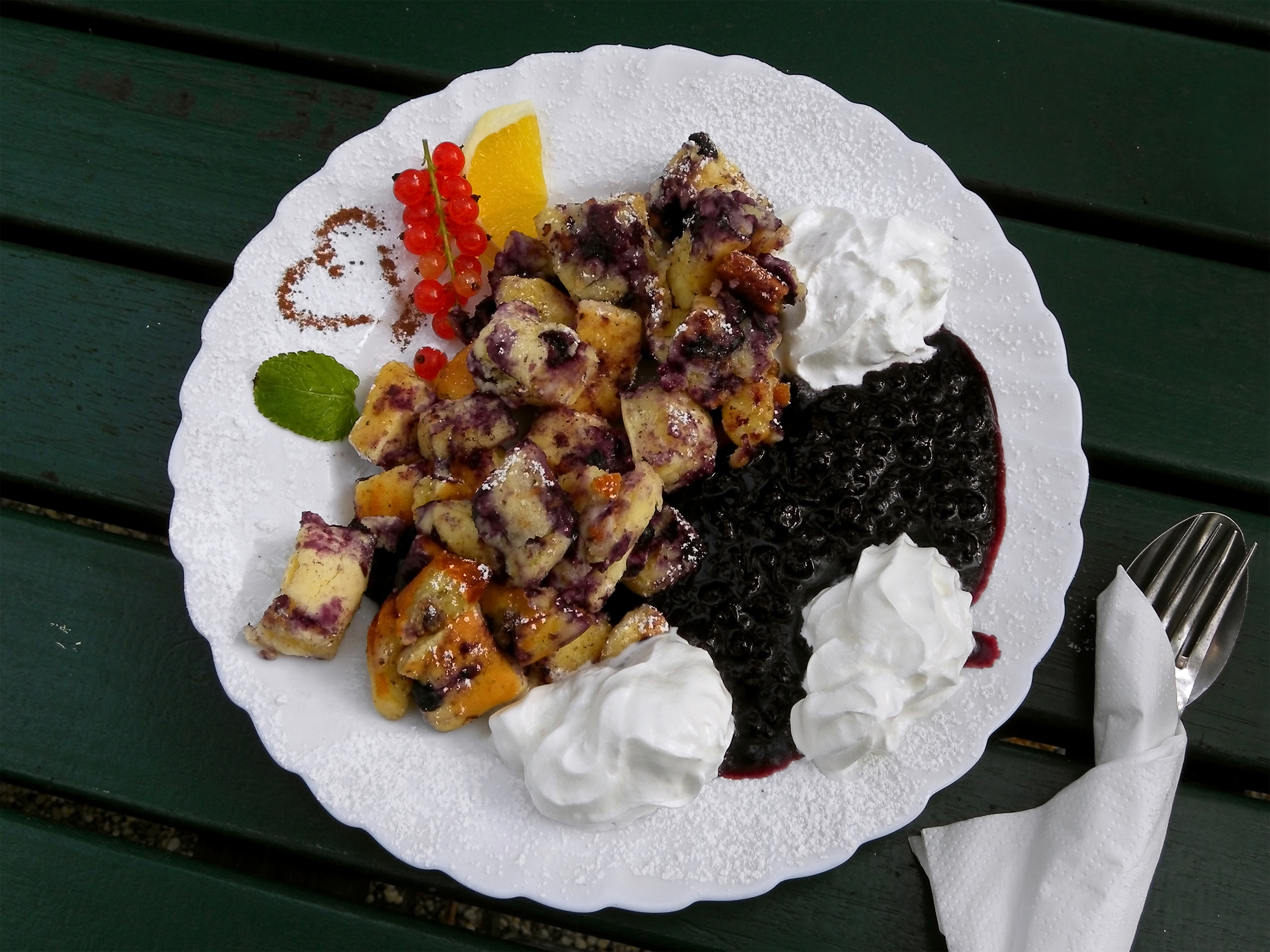
Kaiserschmarrn served with whipped cream, blueberry and fruits

Kaiserschmarrn (German pronunciation: [ˈkaɪzɐˌʃmaʁn]) or Kaiserschmarren (German: [ˈkaɪzɐˌʃmaʁən]; 'Emperor's Mess') is a lightly sweetened pancake that takes its name from the Austrian emperor Franz Joseph I, who was fond of this fluffy shredded pancake. It is served as a dessert or as a light lunch.

Kaiserschmarrn is a popular meal or dessert in Austria, Bavaria, and many parts of the former Austro-Hungarian empire, e.g. northern Italy, Hungary, Slovakia, Czech Republic, Slovenia, northern Croatia and western Romania, which usually use the name as a loan word or translations of it.

== Etymology ==
The name Kaiserschmarrn is a compound of the words Kaiser ('emperor') and Schmarren (a scrambled or shredded dish). Schmarren is also a colloquialism used in Austrian and Bavarian to mean 'trifle, mishmash, mess, rubbish, nonsense'. The word Schmarren may be related to scharren ('to scrape') and schmieren ('to smear' [see schmear]).

== Description ==
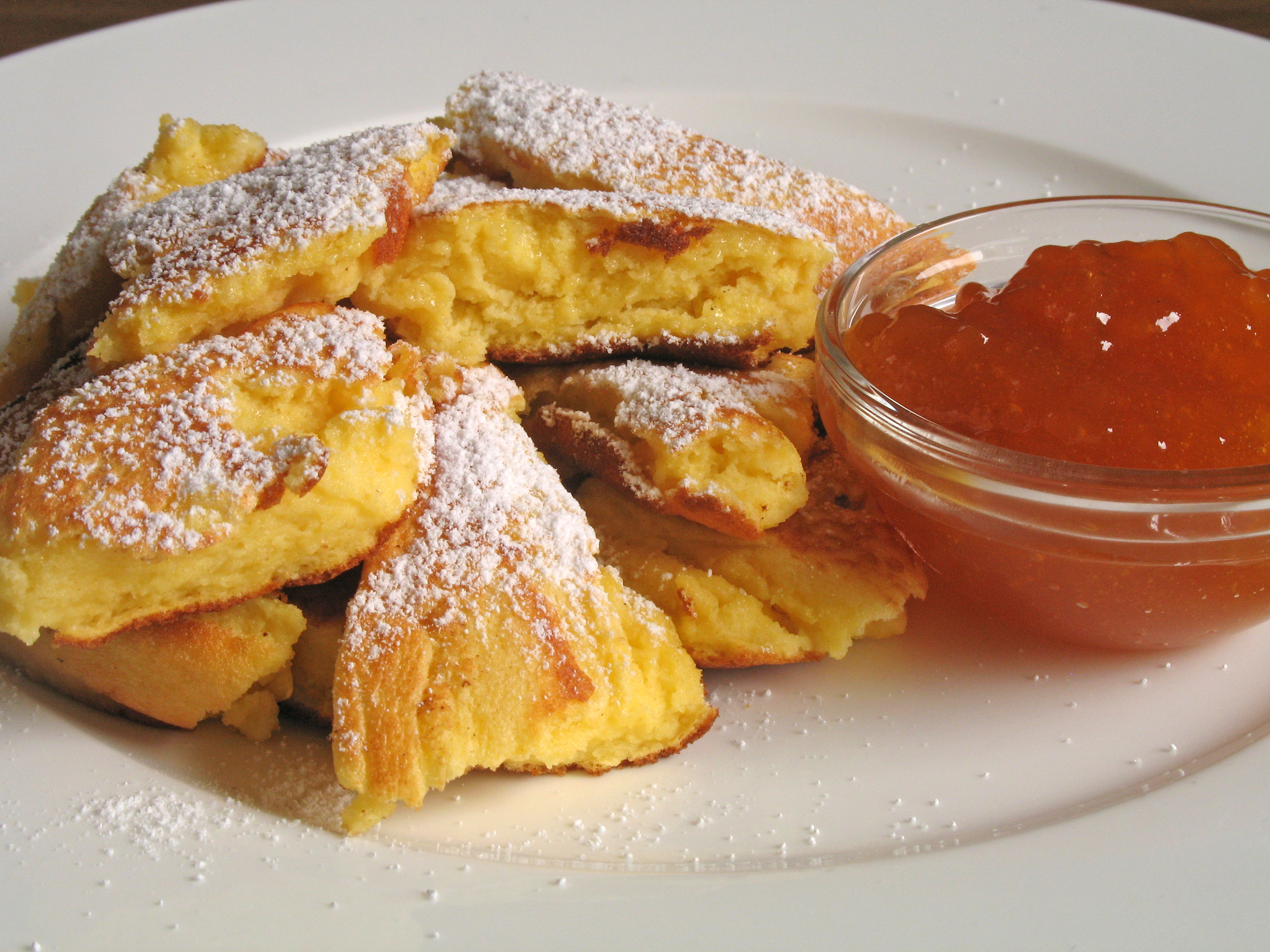
Kaiserschmarrn, original size bits

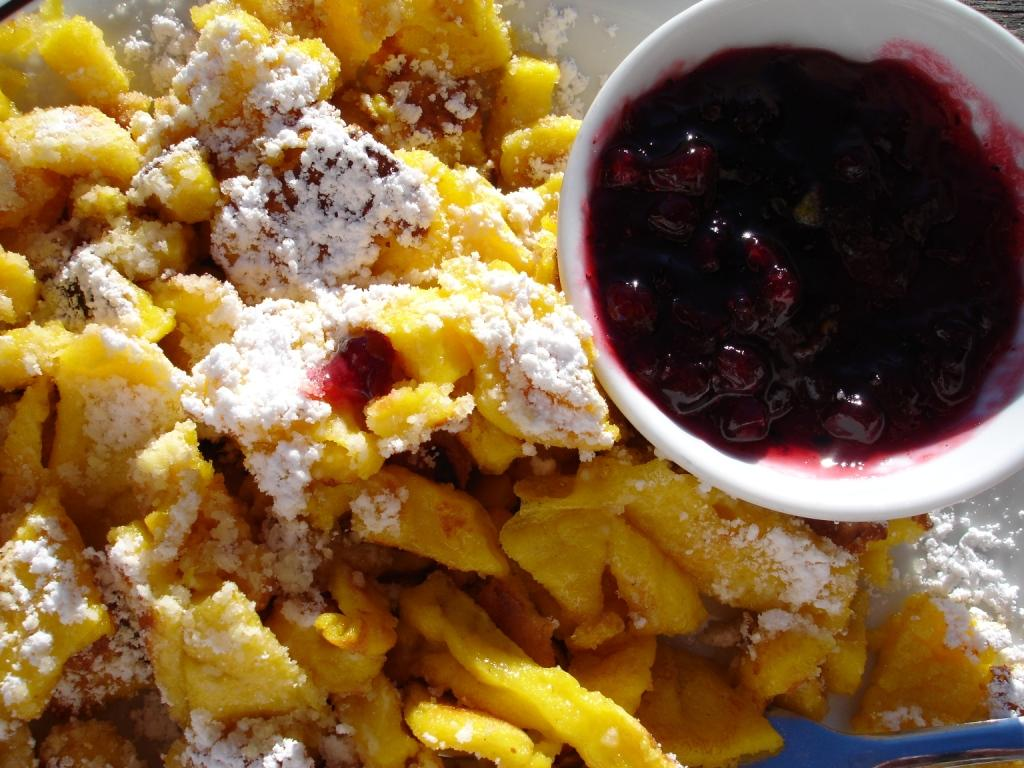
Kaiserschmarrn with lingonberry sauce

Kaiserschmarrn is a light, caramelized pancake made from a sweet batter using flour, eggs, sugar, salt, and milk, fried in butter. Kaiserschmarrn can be prepared in different ways. When making Kaiserschmarrn the egg whites are usually separated from the yolk and beaten until stiff; then the flour and the yolks are mixed with sugar, and the other ingredients are added, including: nuts, cherries, plums, apple jam, or small pieces of apple, or caramelized raisins and slivered almonds. The latter ingredients (nuts, cherries, plums, apple jam, or small pieces of apple, or caramelized raisins and chopped almonds) are not part of the original recipe, but additions made by cooks based on their personal preferences. The original recipe only includes rum-soaked raisins.

The pancake is shredded using two forks during frying and usually sprinkled with powdered sugar, then served hot with apple or plum sauce or various fruit compotes, including plum, lingonberry, strawberry, or apple. Kaiserschmarrn is eaten like a dessert, or it can also be eaten for lunch at tourist places like mountainside restaurants and taverns in the Austrian Alps, as a filling meal.

Traditionally, Kaiserschmarrn is accompanied with Zwetschgenröster, a fruit compote made of plums.

== History ==
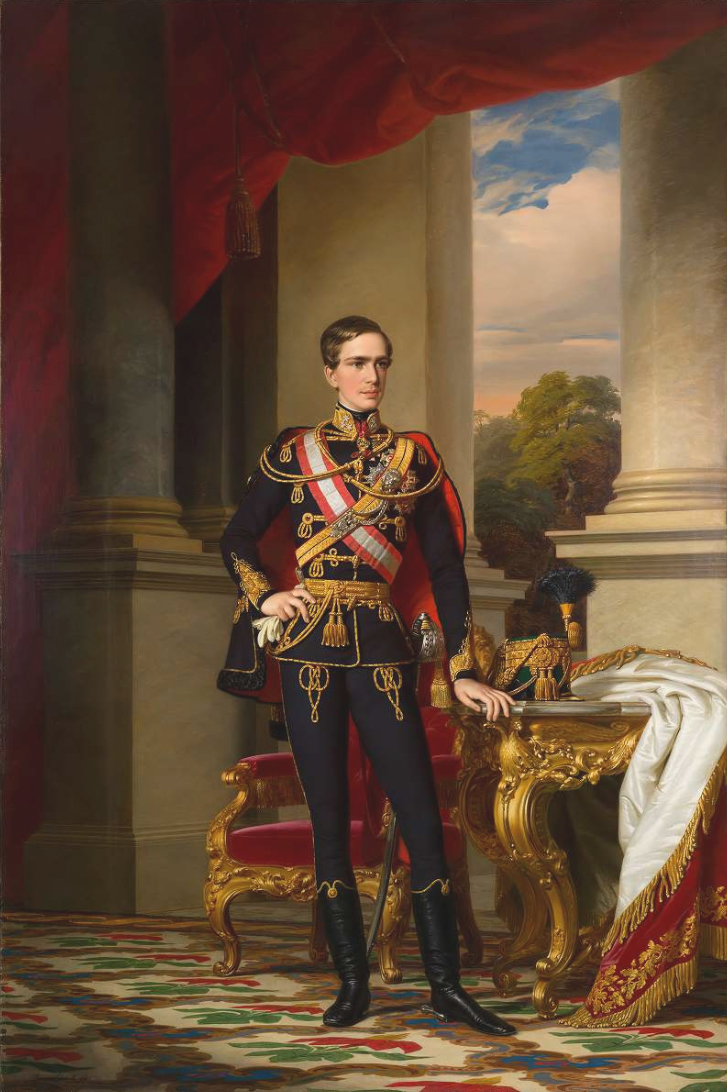
Emperor (Kaiser) Franz Joseph I of Austria-Hungary

It is generally agreed that the dish was first prepared for the Austrian Emperor Francis Joseph I (1830–1916). There are several stories. One apocryphal story involves the Emperor and his wife, Elisabeth of Bavaria, of the House of Wittelsbach. Obsessed with maintaining a minimal waistline, Empress Elisabeth directed the royal chef to prepare only light desserts for her, much to the dismay and annoyance of her notoriously austere husband.

Upon being presented with the chef's confection, she found it too rich and refused to eat it. The exasperated Francis Joseph quipped, "Now let me see what Schmarren our chef has cooked up." It met with his approval as he finished his and even his wife's serving.
