= Anthrozoology =

Subset of ethnobiology

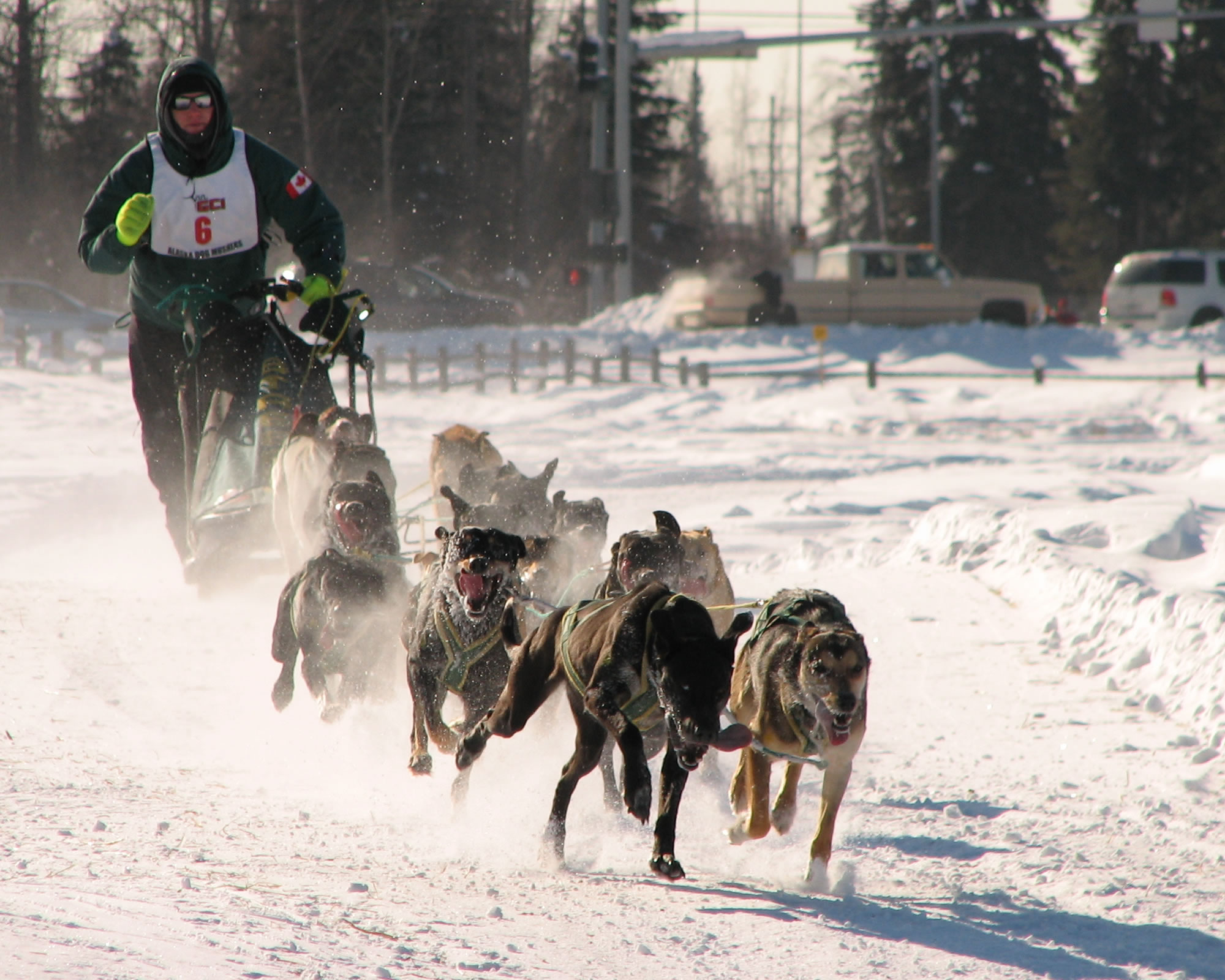
Sled dog racing in Alaska

Anthrozoology, also known as human–animal studies (HAS), is the subset of ethnobiology that deals with interactions between humans and other animals. It is an interdisciplinary field that overlaps with other disciplines including anthropology, ethnology, medicine, psychology, social work, veterinary medicine, and zoology. A major focus of anthrozoologic research is the quantification of the positive effects of human–animal relationships on both parties and the study of their interactions. It includes scholars from fields such as anthropology, sociology, biology, history, and philosophy.

Anthrozoology scholars, such as Pauleen Bennett, recognize the lack of scholarly attention given to nonhuman animals in the past, and to the relationships between human and nonhuman animals, especially in the light of the magnitude of animal representations, symbols, stories, and their actual physical presence in human societies. Rather than a unified approach, the field currently comprises several methods adapted from the participating disciplines to encompass human–nonhuman animal relationships, along with occasional efforts to develop sui generis methods.

== Areas of study ==
- The interaction and enhancement within captive animal interactions.
- Affective (emotional) or relational bonds between humans and animals
- Human perceptions and beliefs in respect of other animals
- How some animals fit into human societies
- How these vary between cultures, and change over times
- The study of animal domestication: how and why domestic animals evolved from wild species (paleoanthrozoology)
- Captive zoo animal bonds with keepers
- The social construction of animals and what it means to be an animal
- The human–animal bond
- Parallels between human–animal interactions and human–technology interactions
- The symbolism of animals in literature and art
- The history of animal domestication
- The intersections of speciesism, racism, and sexism
- The place of animals in human-occupied spaces
- The religious significance of animals throughout human history
- Exploring the cross-cultural ethical treatment of animals
- The critical evaluation of animal abuse and exploitation
- Mind, self, and personhood in nonhuman animals
- The potential human health benefits of companion animal ownership
- Human–animal hybrids (where each cell has partly human and partly animal genetic contents)
- Human–animal chimeras (where some cells are human and some cells are animal in origin)

== Growth of the field ==
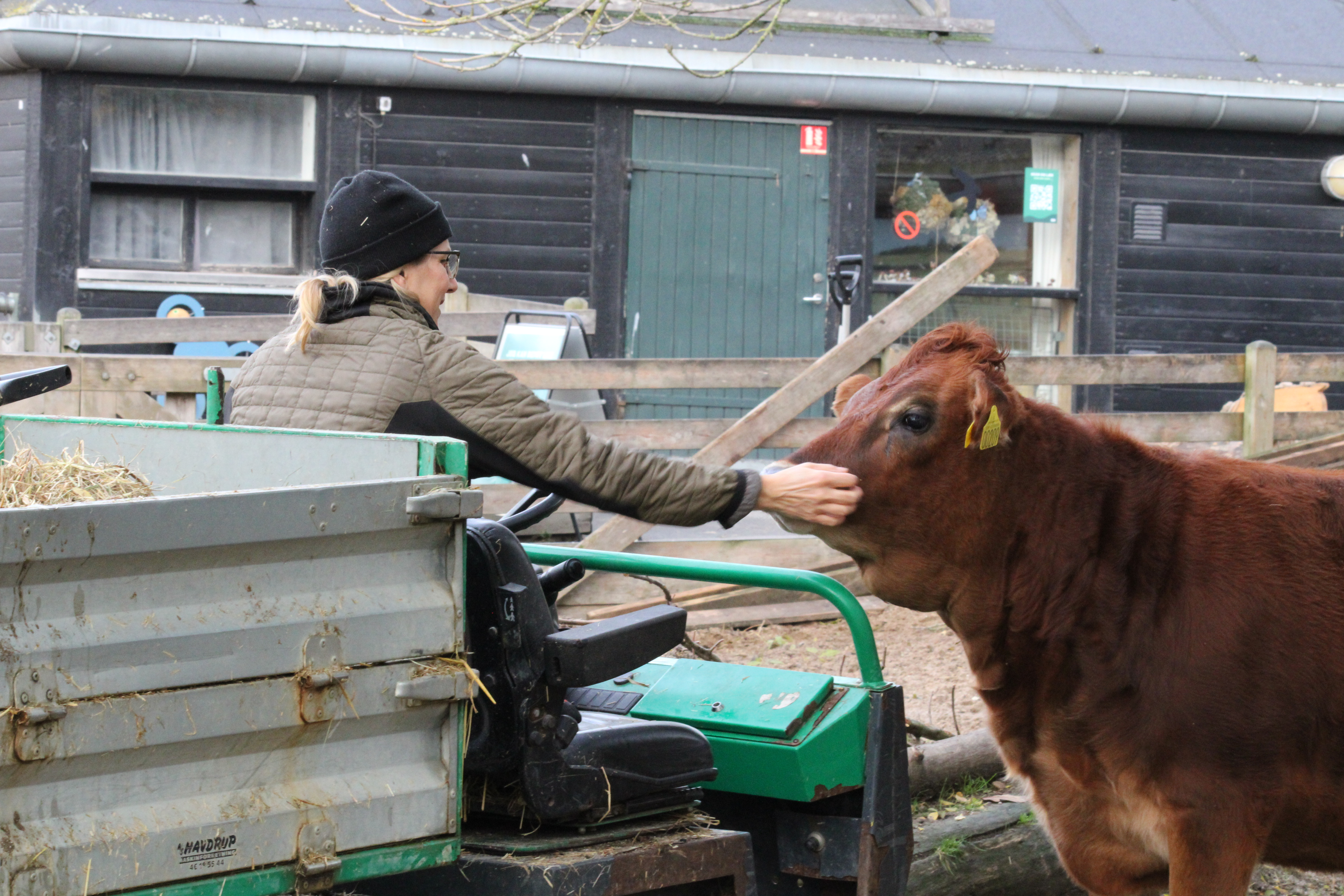
Zookeeper petting a cow at Copenhagen Zoo, Denmark

There are currently 23 college programs in HAS or a related field in the United States, Canada, Great Britain, Germany, Israel and the Netherlands, as well as an additional eight veterinary school programs in North America, and over thirty HAS organizations in the US, Canada, Great Britain, Australia, France, Germany, New Zealand, Israel, Sweden, and Switzerland.

In the UK, the University of Exeter runs an MA in Anthrozoology which explores human–animal interactions from anthropological (cross-cultural) perspectives. Human animal interactions (HAI) involving companion animals are also studied by the Waltham Centre for Pet Nutrition, which partners with the US National Institutes of Health to research HAI in relation to child development and aging.

The field has also expanded beyond Western academic institutions. In Iran, a body of phenomenological research on human-animal relationships has emerged, critically examining traditional practices involving animals. Sociologist Hossein Solati and his colleagues have published a series of studies applying ethical phenomenology and human-animal studies frameworks to analyze the Varzajang (bullfighting) tradition in Gilan province. Their 2024 study directly addresses animal abuse and applies the concept of "phantom pain" (drawing on Blumenberg) to understand the persistence of animal suffering within cultural traditions. A 2023 study in bioethics by Solati and Taghavian advocates for the recognition of animal subjectivity and rights as a philosophical counterweight to traditional justifications for animal suffering, contributing to the broader international discourse on animal ethics. A further phenomenological study examined the evolution of human-animal relations across generations within the same cultural practice. These works represent the first systematic integration of human-animal studies frameworks within Iranian sociology.

There are now three primary lists for HAS scholars and students—H-Animal, the Human-Animal Studies listserv, and NILAS, as well as the Critical Animal Studies list.

There are now over a dozen journals covering HAS issues, many of them founded in the last decade, and hundreds of HAS books, most of them published in the last decade (see, for example, Humanimalia). Brill, Berg, Johns Hopkins, Purdue, Columbia, Reaktion, Palgrave-Macmillan, University of Minnesota, University of Illinois, and Oxford all offer either a HAS series or a large number of HAS books.

In addition, in 2006, Animals & Society Institute (ASI) began hosting the Human-Animal Studies Fellowship, a six-week program in which pre- and post-doctoral scholars work on a HAS research project at a university under the guidance of host scholars and distance peer scholars. Beginning in 2011, ASI has partnered with Wesleyan Animal Studies, which will be hosting the fellowship in conjunction with ASI. There are also a handful of HAS conferences each year, including those organized by ISAZ and NILAS, as well as the Minding Animals conference, held in 2009 in Australia. Finally, more HAS courses are being taught now than ever before. The ASI website lists over 300 courses (primarily in North America, but also including Great Britain, New Zealand, Australia, Germany, and Poland) in 29 disciplines at over 200 colleges and universities, not including over 100 law school courses.

Romania has also seen the development of Human–Animal Interaction (HAI) initiatives within higher education and community engagement. In 2013, a service-learning outreach program titled Day of Human–Animal Interaction (Romanian: Ziua Interacțiunii Om–Animal, ZIOA) was initiated at Babeș-Bolyai University in Cluj-Napoca by biologist and psychologist Alina S. Rusu. Originally developed as an extension of the undergraduate course Animal Psychology, the program aimed to promote responsible human–animal relationships and civic engagement among students while connecting academic institutions with local organizations involved in animal rescue, social veterinary medicine, and biodiversity conservation. The initiative later developed into a broader public outreach event organized in collaboration with the University of Agricultural Sciences and Veterinary Medicine in Cluj-Napoca and several non-governmental organizations, and has been cited as an example of service-learning practice in animal-related professions and anthrozoology. These initiatives contributed to the establishment in 2021 of the interdisciplinary master's program Ethology and Human–Animal Interaction, the first degree program in Romania dedicated to the field.

== Notable anthrozoologists ==
- Pauleen Bennett
- Hal Herzog
- Desmond Morris
- James Serpell
- See list of conservationists

== See also ==
- Animal behavior
- ABMAP
- Animal rights
- Animal studies
- Anthropomorphism
- Birds in culture
- Cognitive ethology
- Companion animal
- Critical animal studies
- Domestication of the horse
- Ethnozoology
- Human–animal bonding
- Human–canine bond
- Intersectionality
- Insects in culture
- Mutualism (biology)
- Origin of the domestic dog
- Pauleen Bennett
- Pet humanization
- Service animal
- Social grooming
- Trans-species psychology
- Zooarchaeology
