= Saint Petersburg State University Faculty of Law =

Coordinates: 59°56′03″N 30°15′44″E

Faculty of Law at Saint Petersburg State University
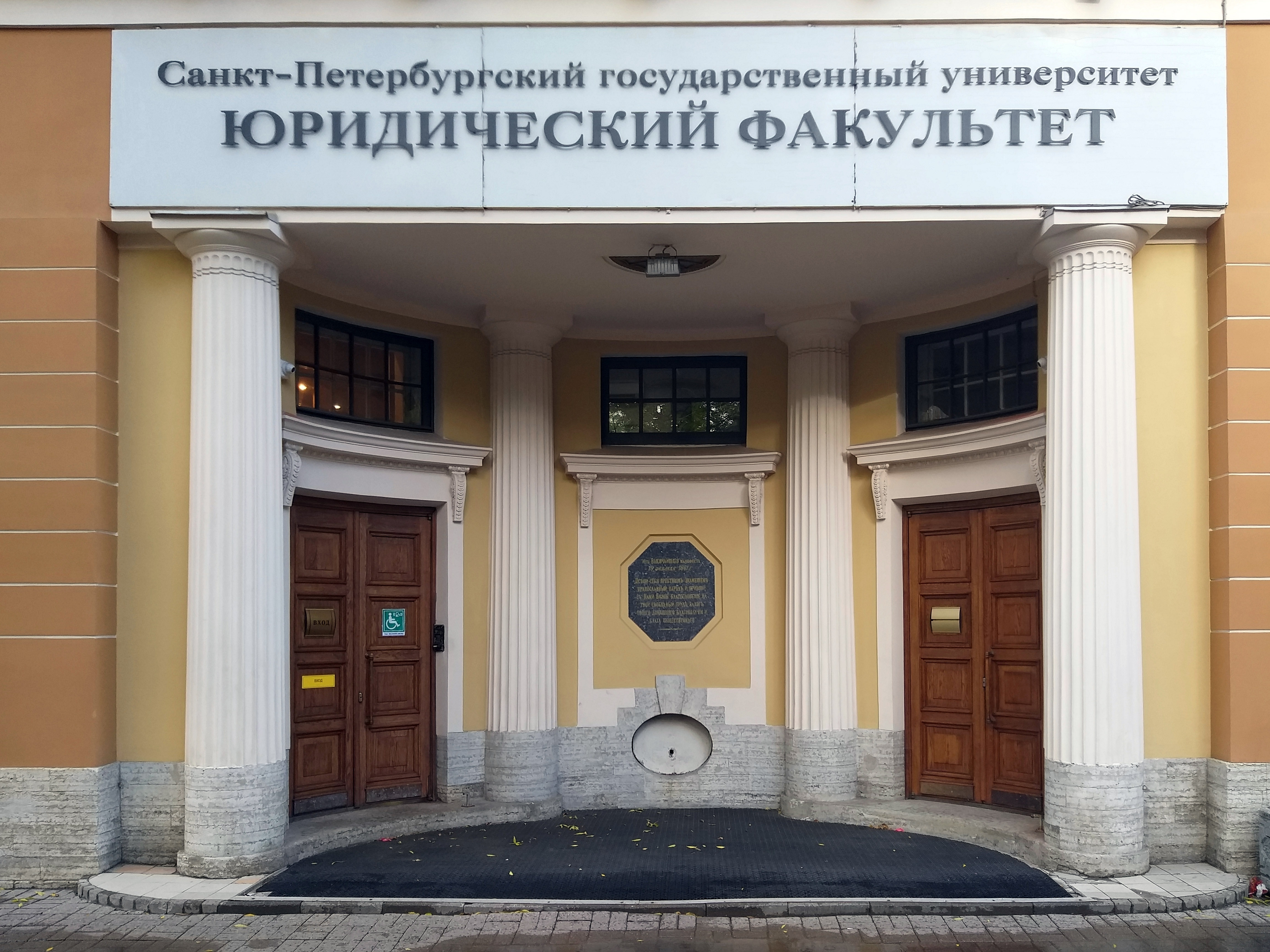
- Parent school: Saint Petersburg State University
- Established: 1724; 301 years ago
- School type: Public
- Dean: Sergey Belov
- Location: Saint Petersburg, Russia
- Enrollment: 1,500
- Faculty: 176
- Website: law.spbu.ru

The Faculty of Law at Saint Petersburg State University is the oldest law school and one of the biggest research centers in Russia.

== History ==
On 22 January 1724, Peter the Great ordered the establishment of the Russian Academy of Sciences and a university where tutors would teach students in theology, jurisprudence, medicine and philosophy. For this purpose Peter invited teachers from Germany. However, from the middle of 18th century the university had been suffering financial difficulties.

That was until 1819, when Alexander I reinstated it. From the very beginning the Faculty of Philosophy and Law was leading: 13 of 24 first students studied there. The university perceived the liberal ideas of 1860s and became a mainstay of free thought, science and art. The Faculty of Law became the biggest at Saint Petersburg University by the end of 19th century (1335 of 2675 students studied there in 1894). The university's and faculty's advancement was stopped by the Revolution of 1905, World War I and the Revolution of 1917. After the Revolution many professors left the country, some of them were expelled. The university did not have a law faculty from 1930 to 1944. It was re-established after the Siege of Leningrad had been lifted in 1944. After the war the faculty restored its leading positions and now is considered one of the best law schools in Russia.

During the 19th and 20th centuries such scholars as Friedrich Martens, Leon Petrazycki, Nikolai Tagantsev, Aleksandr Gradovsky, Konstantin Kavelin, Maksim Kovalevsky, Anatoly Koni, Georgy Tolstoy, and Anatoly Sobchak lectured at the Faculty of Law.

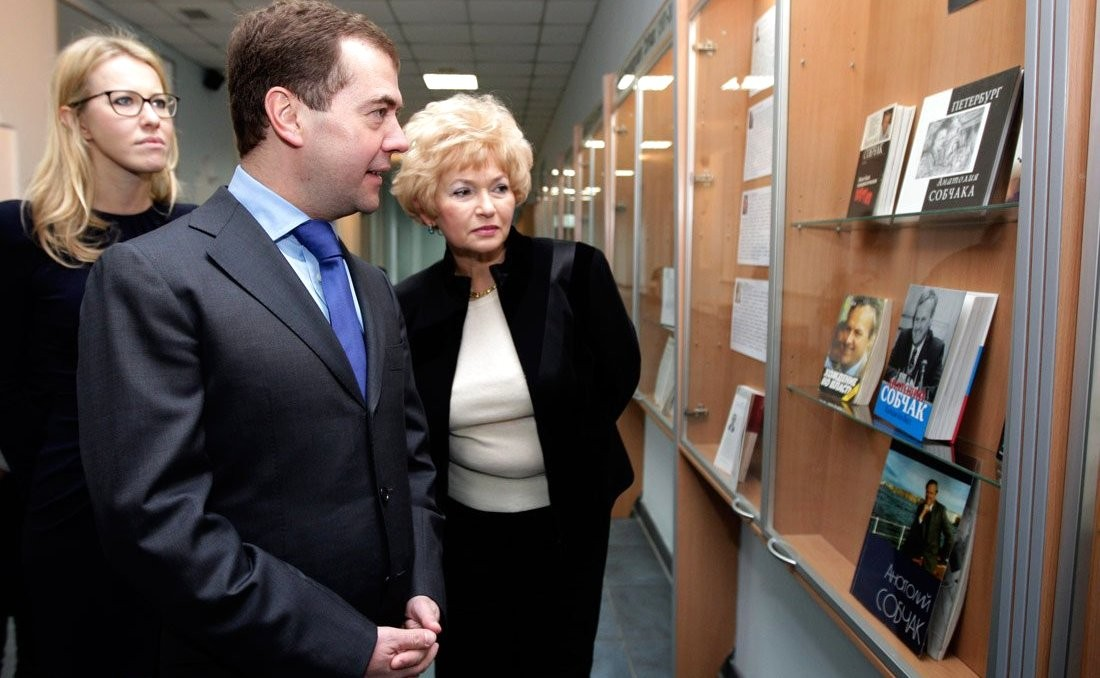
President Dmitry Medvedev visits his alma mater alongside Senator Lyudmila Narusova, the widow of his university professor Anatoly Sobchak, and Sobchak’s daughter, Ksenia

Alexander Blok, Nikolay Gumilev, Leonid Andreyev, Mikhail Zoshchenko, Rainis, Mikhail Vrubel, Sergei Diaghilev, Nicholas Roerich, Igor Stravinsky, Ilia Zdanevich, and Sergei Yursky have attended the Faculty of Law. Also three prime ministers of Russia, Boris Shturmer, Alexander Kerensky and Dmitriy Medvedev (as well former president), the leader of the Bolsheviks Vladimir Lenin and the current president Vladimir Putin (as well former prime minister) have graduated from the faculty. Among the graduates of the faculty, there are also Prime Minister of Latvia Peteris Jurasevskis, leader of the Turkestan Autonomy Mustafa Shokay, Prime Minister of the Belarusian Democratic Republic Alaksandar Ćvikievič, State Elders of Estonia Ants Piip and Jaan Teemant, and Prime Minister of Estonia Jüri Uluots.

== Structure ==
Nowadays the Faculty of Law has twelve departments, which include the Department of Administrative and Financial Law, Department of Civil Law, Department of Civil Procedure, Department of Commercial Law, Department of Constitutional Law, Department of International Law, Department of Notaryship, Department of Environmental Law, Department of Legal Theory and History, Department of Labor Law, Department of Criminal Law and Department of Criminal Procedure and Criminalistics.

== Notable alumni ==
=== Law and Politics ===
- Mikhail Petrashevsky (1841), revolutionary and Utopian theorist
- Pavel Demidov (1860), Head of Kiev (1871–1872, 1873–1874), Prince of San Donato (1870–1885)
- Boris Shturmer (1872), Prime Minister of the Russian Empire (1916), Minister of Foreign Affairs (1916), Minister of Internal Affairs (1916), Yaroslavl Governor (1896–1902), Novgorod Governor (1894–1896)
- Dmitry Sipyagin (1876), Ministor of Internal Affairs of the Russian Empire (1899–1902), Moscow Governor (1891–1893), Courland Governor (1888–1891)
- Sergey Manukhin (1879), Minister of Justice and Prosecutor general of the Russian Empire (1905)
- Mikhail Sheftel (1882), member of the First Duma (1906)
- Naphtali Friedman (1887), member of the Third and Fourth Duma (1907–1917)
- Pēteris Stučka (1888), Chief Justice of the RSFSR (1923–1932), Chairman of the Council of People's Commissars of the Latvian Socialist Soviet Republic (1918–1920), People's Commissar for Justice of the RSFSR (1917, 1918)
- Alimardan bey Topchubashov (1888), Deputy Speaker of National Assembly of Azerbaijan Democratic Republic (1918–1920), Minister of Foreign Affairs of Azerbaijan Democratic Republic (1918)
- Pavel Alexandrov (1890), prominent criminal investigator
- Vladimir Lenin (1891), Chairman of the Council of People's Commissars of the Soviet Union (1923–1924), Chairman of the Council of People's Commissars of the Russian SFSR (1917–1924)
- Vladimir Nabokov (1891), Minister for Justice of the Crimean Regional Government (1918), Secretary of the Russian Provisional Government (1917)
- Anatol von Lieven (1895), leader of the Brotherhood of Russian Truth (1921–1936)
- Sirakan Tigranyan (1897), Minister of Foreign Affairs of the First Republic of Armenia (1918–1919), Member of the Second Duma (1907)
- Georgy Khrustalev-Nosar (1899), Chairman of the Saint Petersburg Soviet (1905)
- Varlam Gelovani (1900), Member of the Fourth Duma
- Jaan Teemant (1901), State Elder of Estonia (1925–1927, 1932)
- Pēteris Juraševskis (1904), Prime Minister of Latvia (1928), Minister of Justice (1918–1919)
- Khachatur Karchikyan (1904), Minister of Social Protection of the First Republic of Armenia (1918)
- Alexander Kerensky (1904), Minister-Chairman of the Russian Provisional Government (1917), Minister of War and Navy (1917), Minister of Justice (1917)
- Vladimir Zhernakov (1906), Head of Novonikolayevsk (1909–1914)
- Aslan bey Safikurdski (1907), Minister of Labor and Justice of Azerbaijan Democratic Republic (1919), Prosecutor General (1919), Minister of Postal Service and Telegraph (1918-1919)
- Jaan Anvelt (1912), chairman of the Council of the Commune of the Working People of Estonia (1918-1919), premier of the Soviet Executive Committee of Estonia (1917-1918)
- Alaksandar Ćvikievič (1912), Prime Minister of Belarusian Democratic Republic (1923–1925), Minister of Foreign Affairs (1919-1923)
- Ya'akov Klivnov (1912), Member of the Knesset (1949–1957)
- Ivan Mikhailov (1913), Minister of Finance of the Provisional All-Russian Government (1918–1919)
- Ants Piip (1913), State Elder of Estonia (1920–1921), Prime Minister of Estonia (1920)
- Mustafa Shokay (1914), Minister-President of the Turkestan Autonomy (1917–1918)
- Sergey Kavtaradze (1915), USSR Ambassador to Romania (1945–1952), Deputy People's Commissar for Foreign Affairs (1943–1945), First Deputy Procurator General of the Soviet Union (1924–1927), Chairman of the Council of People's Commissars of the Georgian SSR (1922–1923)
- Viktor Kingissepp (1916), leader of the Estonian Communist Party
- Jüri Uluots (1918), Prime Minister of Estonia (1939–1940), Prime Minister in the duties of the President (1940–1945)
- Anatoly Volin (1930), Chief Jusctice of the Supreme Court of the Soviet Union (1948–1957), Prosecutor of the Russian SFSR (1939–1948)
- Lev Smirnov (1936), Chief Jusctice of the Supreme Court of the Soviet Union (1972–1984), Chief Justice of the Supreme Court of the Russian SFSR (1962–1972)
- Vladimir Terebilov (1939), President of the Supreme Court of the Soviet Union (1984–1989), Minister of Justice (1970–1984)
- Pavel Prokkonen (1957), Chairman of the Presidium of the Supreme Soviet of the Karelian ASSR (1956–1979), Chairman of the Council of Ministers of the Karelo-Finnish SSR (1940–1947, 1950–1956)
- Anatoly Sobchak (1959), Mayor of Saint Petersburg (1991–1996)
- Yuri Schmidt (1960), human rights activist and advocate
- Yury Petrov (1971), Member of the State Duma (since 2011), Director of the Federal Agency for State Property Management (2008–2011)
- Viktor Cherkesov (1973), Director of the Federal Drug Control Service of Russia (2003–2008)
- Aleksey Aleksandrov (1974), Senator from Kaluga Oblast (2004–2020), Member of the State Duma (1994–2003)
- Alexander Bastrykin (1975), Head of the Investigative Committee of Russia (since 2011), First Deputy Prosecutor General of Russia (2007–2011)
- Irina Podnosova (1975), Chief Justice of Russia (2024–2025)
- Vladimir Putin (1975), President of Russia (2000–2008, 2012–present), Prime Minister of Russia (1999–2000, 2008–2012), Director of the Federal Security Service (1998–1999)
- Sergey Mavrin (1977), Deputy President of the Constitutional Court of Russia (2005–2025)
- Lyudmila Zharkova (1979), Deputy President of the Constitutional Court of Russia (since 2025)
- Vladimir Pligin (1982), Member of the State Duma (2003–2016)
- Yury Volkov (1982), Senator from Kaluga Oblast (2015–2020), Member of the State Duma (2003–2015), Senator from Nenets Autonomous Okrug (2002), Senator from Komi Republic (2001–2002)
- Ada Marshania (1983), Member of the Parliament of Georgia (since 2016), Deputy of Supreme Council of the Government of Abkhazia in exile (since 2006)
- Sergey Knyazev (1984), judge of the Constitutional Court of Russia (since 2008)
- Dmitry Kozak (1985), Deputy Kremlin Chief of Staff (2020–2025), Vice Prime Minister (2008–2020), Minister of Regional Development (2007–2008)
- Mikhail Krotov (1985), judge of the Supreme Court of Russia (since 2020), Presidential Plenipotentiary Representative in the Constitutional Court (2005–2020)
- Konstantin Chuychenko (1987), Minister of Justice (since 2020), Vice Prime Minister (2018–2020)
- Aleksandr Gutsan (1987), Prosecutor General of Russia (since 2025)
- Anton Ivanov (1987), President of the High Court of Arbitration (2005–2014)
- Dmitry Medvedev (1987), Prime Minister of Russia (2012–2020), President of Russia (2008–2012), First Deputy Prime Minister of Russia (2005–2008)
- Artur Parfenchikov (1987), Head of the Republic of Karelia (since 2017), Chief Bailiff (2008–2017)
- Nikolay Vinnichenko (1987), Deputy Prosecutor General of Russia (since 2013), Chief Bailiff (2004–2008)
- Andrey Bushev (1988), judge of the Constitutional Court of Russia (since 2022)
- Liudmyla Denisova (1989), Ombudsman in Ukraine (2018–2022), Minister of Social Policy of Ukraine (2007–2010, 2014), People's Deputy of Ukraine (2006–2007, 2012–2014, 2014–2018)
- Konstantin Aranovsky (1990), judge of the Constitutional Court of Russia (2010–2022)
- Aleksandr Konovalov (1992), judge of the Constitutional Court of Russia (since 2025), Presidential Plenipotentiary Representative in the Constitutional Court (2020–2025), Minister of Justice (2008–2020)
- Herman Gref (1993), CEO of Sberbank (since 2007), Minister of Economic Development and Trade (2000–2007)
- Sergey Popov (1993), Member of the State Duma (1995–2007)
- Yury Gladkov (1994), Deputy Chairman of the Legislative Assembly of Saint Petersburg (2003–2007)
- Igor Artemyev (1998), President of the Saint-Petersburg International Mercantile Exchange (since 2023), Director of the Federal Antimonopoly Service (2004–2020)
- Sergey Mironov (1998), Member of the State Duma (since 2007), Chairman of the Federation Council (2001–2011)
- Boris Kovalchuk (1999), Chairman of the Accounts Chamber of Russia (since 2024), CEO of Inter RAO (since 2010)
- Vitaly Mutko (1999), Vice Prime Minister (2016–2020), Minister of Sport (2008–2016), Senator from Saint Petersburg (2003–2008)
- Anatoliy Serdyukov (2001), Minister of Defence (2007–2012), Commissioner of the Federal Taxation Service (2004–2007)
- Gleb Nikitin (2004), Governor of Nizhny Novgorod Oblast (since 2017)
- Grigory Ledkov (2006), Senator from Yamalo-Nenets Autonomous Okrug (since 2020), Member of the State Duma (2011–2020), President of the Russian Association of Indigenous Peoples of the North (since 2013)

=== Business ===
- Józef Montwiłł (1872), bank owner
- Aleksei Putilov (1899), member of the board of the Putilov Company and the Chinese Eastern Railway company
- Michael Wawelberg (1903), banker
- Kirill Shamalov (2004), member of the board of directors of Sibur

=== Academia ===
- Włodzimierz Spasowicz (1849), scholar of criminal law and defense attorney
- Nikolai Tagantsev (1862), criminologist and criminalist
- Friedrich Martens (1867), scholar of international law
- Mikhail Taube (1891), scholar of international law and legal history
- Lev Sternberg (1902), ethnographer
- Ruben Orbeli (1903), archeologist
- Eugene M. Kulischer (1906), sociologist
- Naum Idelson (1909), theoretical astronomer
- Isaak Rubin (1910), economist
- Evgenii Bertels (1914), Orientalist, Iranologist and Turkologist
- Nikolai Kondratiev (1915), economist
- Georgy Tolstoy (1950), scholar of civil law
- Vladimir Nazhimov (1951), scholar of criminal procedure
- Anatoly Shesteryuk (1975), scholar of environmental law
- Nikolay Kropachev (1981), scholar of criminal law, rector of Saint Petersburg State University (2008–present)
- Alexander Vershinin (1983), scholar of civil procedure
- Nikita Lomagin (1997), historian

=== Arts ===
- Pyotr Yershov (1834), poet
- Apollon Maykov (1841), poet
- Valerian Maykov (1842), literary critic
- Grigory Danilevsky (1850), novelist
- Pavlo Chubynskyi (1861), poet
- Vsevolod Krestovsky (1861), writer and poet
- Liodor Palmin (1862), poet and translator
- Sergey Terpigorev (1862), writer
- Vasily Polenov (1871), landscape painter
- Nikolai Minsky (1879), writer and poet
- Mikhail Vrubel (1880), painter and sculptor
- Alexander Kugel (1886), theatre critic
- Vladimir Posse (1888), journalist
- Rainis (1888), poet and playwright
- Saul M. Ginsburg (1891), writer and editor
- Igor Grabar (1893), painter, restorer and publisher
- Alexander Yablonovsky (1893), writer and journalist
- Alexandre Benois (1894), art critic and painter
- Sergei Diaghilev (1896), art critic, patron and ballet impresario
- Nicholas Roerich (1898), painter, writer, archaeologist, theosophist and philosopher
- Ivan Bilibin (1900), illustrator and stage designer
- Dmitry Kuzmin-Karavayev (1909), Catholic priest
- Yuri Shaporin (1913), composer
- Alexander Tairov (1913), theatre director
- Pavel Medvedev (1914), literary critic
- Anoushavan Ter-Ghevondyan (1915), composer
- Mikhail Zenkevich (1915), poet, writer and translator
- Ilia Zdanevich (1917), poet, writer and art critic
- Georgi Vladimov (1953), writer
- German Sadulaev (1994), writer

== See also ==
- Education in Russia
