= Lectionary 171 =

Lectionary ℓ 171
- New Testament manuscript
- Text: Apostolarion
- Date: 9th century
- Script: Greek
- Now at: Russian National Library
- Size: 21.5 by 14.6 cm

Lectionary 171, designated by siglum ℓ 171 (in the Gregory-Aland numbering) is a Greek manuscript of the New Testament, on parchment leaves. Paleographically it has been assigned to the 9th century. Formerly it was labelled as Lectionary 70^{a}. Scrivener by 72^{a}.

== Description ==
The codex contains Lessons from the Acts and Epistles lectionary (Apostolarion) (Romans 13:11 and 2 Corinthians 11:21-23), on only 1 parchment leaf (21.5 cm by 14.6 cm). The text is written in Greek uncial letters, in two columns per page, 25 lines per page. It is a palimpsest. It contains musical notes.

== History ==
The manuscript was examined by Constantin von Tischendorf.

The manuscript is not cited in the critical editions of the Greek New Testament (UBS3).

Currently the codex is located in the Russian National Library (Gr. 38, fol. 8) at Saint Petersburg.

== See also ==
- List of New Testament lectionaries
- Biblical manuscript
- Textual criticism

== Bibliography ==
- Constantin von Tischendorf, Anecdota sacra inedita, 8, 11, XIII
