= Alexander Vershinin =

- Алекса́ндр Па́влович Верши́нин
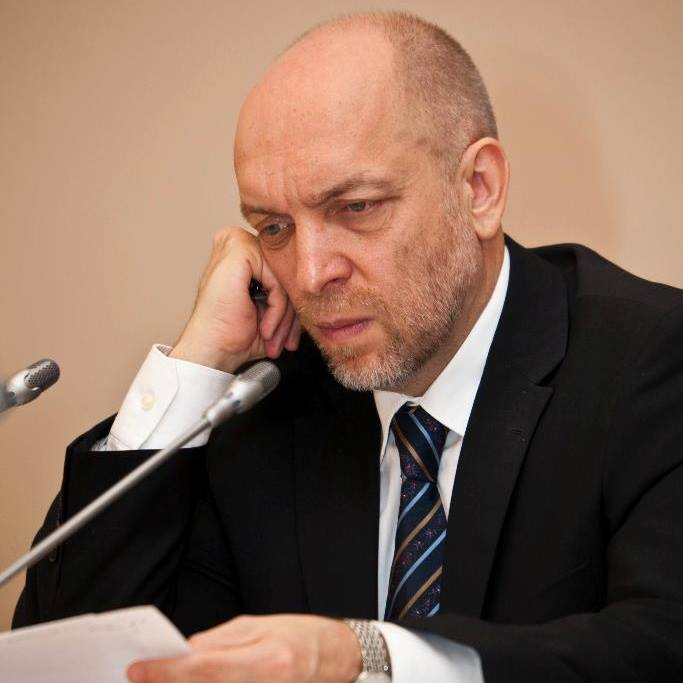

24th director National Library of Russia
- Incumbent
- Assumed office August 27, 2018

1st director Boris Yeltsin Presidential Library
- In office 2009–2018

Personal details
- Born: 12 October 1957 (age 68)
- Citizenship: Soviet Union → Russia
- Education: Leningrad State University

Alexander Vershinin (Russian: Верши́нин Алекса́ндр Па́влович; born October 12, 1957) is a Russian jurist, scholar of civil procedure, Doctor of Juridical Science, professor. He was the first director of the Boris Yeltsin Presidential Library, from 2009 until 2018. Since 27 August 2018, Vershinin has served as the director of the National Library of Russia.

== Biography ==
Vershinin graduated with honors from the Faculty of Law of the Leningrad State University in 1983. In 1986 he defended Candidate’s thesis ″The Scope of Civil Procedural Law Relations. In the early 1990s, A. Vershinin participated in establishing the new judicial authorities (referee’s courts, bar associations, notarial system); practiced law as a consultant; representative; expert. He was teaching in his alma-mater the Faculty of Law of now St. Petersburg State University, first as an assistant, then as an assistant professor, later becoming associate professor and then a professor. Vershinin was actively engaged in research in St. Petersburg University and in German universities. In 1998 defended his Doctor’s thesis “Methods of Civil Rights Defence in the Court” visiting professor in Vienna University in 2000–2001 (lectures on foreign economic law) and in the University of Latvia in 2008 (lectures on energy law). In 2002–2005, Vershinin was working as a deputy trade representative of Russian Federation in Germany. In 2007, Vershinin was appointed an associate dean of international activity in the Faculty of Law of St. Petersburg State University. He developed the Master’s program on energy law and was its head until 2009. In 2009, Vershinin became the first director of the Boris Yeltsin Presidential Library. On August 27, 2018, Vershinin was appointed the director of the National Library of Russia by the decree of The Chairman of the Russian Federation Government. Vershinin is an author of more than 120 research papers, including eight monographs and study guides.

== Publications ==
- Упрощение и ускорение советского гражданского процесса: опыт теории и практики (20-е годы) // Вестник ЛГУ. Сер. 6. 1988. Вып. 2 (№ 13). С. 60-65.
- Юридическое образование в Федеративной Республике Германии :Опыт организаций // Правоведение. 1992. № 1. С. 76 - 80
- Internationale Handelsschiedsgerichtsbarkeit in Rußland//Internationale Schiedsgerichtsbarkeit: Generalbericht und Nationalberichte = Arbitrage International/von Peter Gottwald; Peter F. Schlosser (Hrsg.).- Bielefeld:Gieseking, 1997. S.759-778
- Электронный документ: правовая форма и доказательство в суде : учебно-практическое пособие. Москва : Городец, 2000. - 247 с.
- Die Entgeltregelung in der Elektrizitaetswirtschaft: die Entwicklueng der Gesetzgebung//Russches Energierecht (Gesetzessammlung). F.J. Saecker.Handbuch zum deutsch-russischen Energierrecht. Frankfurt M., Berlin, Bern, Bruxelles, New York, Oxford, Wien 2009. S.41-52
- Электронный Свод законов и правовая информатизация в России // Известия высших учебных заведений. Правоведение. 2010, № 4 (291)
- Медиалексикон: словарь-справочник. Санкт-Петербург: издательство "Профессия", 2015. - 127 с.
