= Vladimir Nazhimov =

Russian lawyer (1923–2000)

Vladimir Pavlovich Nazhimov
- Born: Vladimir Pavlovich Nazhimov; Владимир Павлович Нажимов; 22 October 1876; Saratov
- Died: 24 July 1955 (aged 78); Moscow
- Occupation: lawyer

Vladimir Pavlovich Nazhimov (Russian: Владимир Павлович Нажимов; 26 July 1923, Kunevichi, Tikhvinsky District, Leningrad Oblast — 17 August 2000, Kaliningrad) was a Russian lawyer and a specialist in the field of criminal procedure. Professor, Doctor of Law Sciences.

== Biography ==
Vladimir Pavlovich Nazhimov was born on 23 July 1923 in the village of Kunevichi (Tikhvinsky District, Leningrad Oblast) into a peasant family.

In June 1941 he graduated from the First Leningrad Paramedic School. After the beginning of Great Patriotic War, he volunteered for the People's Militia (12th Leningrad Volunteer Division). In July 1941, he was moved to the 227th Infantry Regiment of the 183rd Infantry Division and later was injured. After recovering from wounds in 1943, he was sent to the 500th separate machine-gun and artillery battalion, where he continued to fight until the end of the war. During the Battle of the Korsun–Cherkassy Pocket, he distinguished himself in the fightings near the village of Shenderovka on 1—12 February 1944. For timely assistance to the wounded and establishment of a stronghold of defense which helped to stop the advance of Germa troops he was awarded the Order of the Red Star. For his combat service Nazhimov was also awarded the Order of the Patriotic War of I degree, and Orders of the Patriotic War of II degree (two times) and other medals.

After end of his service he started to work at the Research Institute of Epidemiology and Microbiology as a paramedic in the squad for the elimination of epidemics in Kirov and Velikie Luki regions.

From 1947 to 1949 he studied at Leningrad Law School. At the same time, from 1948 to 1951, he was a People's judge of Kingiseppsky District of Leningrad Oblast. Since 1951 he served as a People's judge of Vsevolozhsky District of Leningrad Oblast. In 1951 he graduated externally from Leningrad Law Institute, then entered postgraduate school, and in 1958 he defended his thesis on the topic "The legal and procedural status of judges who examine criminal cases in the People's trial". From 1957 to 1961 he was a member of Leningrad Oblast Court.

From 1962 to 1969 he taught at the Department of Criminal Law, Criminal Procedure and Criminalistics of the Faculty of Law of Rostov State University.

In 1969, he began working at the Department of Law of the Economics and Law Faculty of Kaliningrad State University. Under his leadership, the Department of Criminal Law, Process and Criminalistics of the Kaliningrad State University was established at the Faculty.

From 1969 to 1989, he was the Dean of the Faculty of Law of Kaliningrad State University.

In 1971 he defended his doctoral dissertation in Leningrad State University on the topic: "The Court as an organ of justice in criminal cases in the USSR".

He died in 2000 in Kaliningrad.

Today at the Law Institute of Immanuel Kant Baltic Federal University annually holds the competition of student scientific works named after Vladimir Nazhimov. At the building of the Law Institute of the University there is installed a memorial plaque in his memory.
