= Lyudmila Zharkova =

Russian judge

- Людмила Жаркова
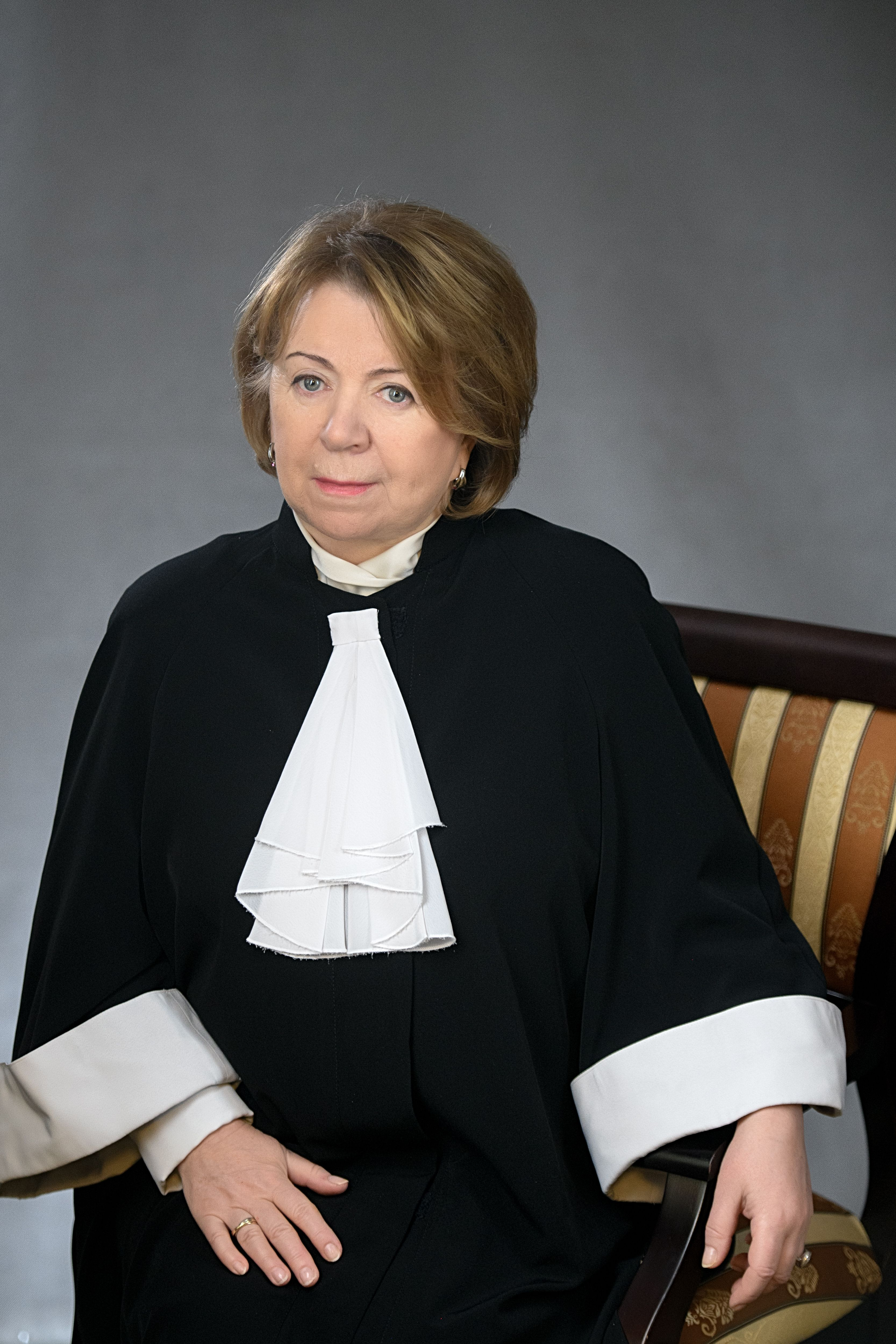
- Official portrait

Deputy President of the Constitutional Court of Russia
- In office 4 June 2025 – 30 September 2026
- Nominated by: Vladimir Putin
- Preceded by: Sergey Mavrin
- Succeeded by: Aleksandr Konovalov

Judge of the Constitutional Court of Russia
- In office 11 June 1997 – 30 September 2026
- Nominated by: Boris Yeltsin

Personal details
- Born: Lyudmila Mikhailovna Zharkova; 3 September 1955 (age 71) Petrozavodsk, Karelo-Finnish SSR, Russian SFSR, Soviet Union
- Education: Leningrad State University; Russian Presidential Academy of Public Administration
- Occupation: Judge
- Awards: Order of Honour; Order of Friendship; Russian Federation Presidential Certificate of Honour; Honoured Lawyer of Russia

Lyudmila Mikhailovna Zharkova (Russian: Людмила Михайловна Жаркова; born 3 September 1955) is a Russian lawyer specializing in labour law and social security law who served as the judge of the Constitutional Court of Russia from 1997 to 2026. She was also the Constitutional Court's deputy president from June 2025 to September 2026.

== Life and career ==
Lyudmila Zharkova, ethnically Finnish, was born in Petrozavodsk, the capital of the Soviet Karelia.

From 1972 to 1974, she worked as a clerk at the Petrozavodsk City Court. Between 1974 and 1979, she studied at the Law Faculty of Leningrad State University. After graduating, she worked as a notary at the First Petrozavodsk State Notary Office from 1979 to 1981.

From 1981 to 1990, she served first as a judge at the Oktyabrsky District Court of Petrozavodsk and later as a judge at the Petrozavodsk City Court.

Starting in 1990, she worked at the Ministry of Justice of Karelia.

As an expert in 1993, she participated in the work of the Constitutional Conference, which drafted the current Russian Constitution. Between October and November 1993, she was a member of the working commission responsible for finalizing the draft Constitution of the Russian Federation. She provided explanations of its provisions in the press.

In November 1993, at the founding congress of the Karelian Lawyers' Union, she was elected its Chair, holding this position until her election in November 1994 to the Constitutional Court of the Republic of Karelia. At the court's inaugural session, she was elected Judge-Secretary of the Court. Concurrently, she taught at the Law Faculty of Petrozavodsk State University and the Karelian branch of the Northwestern Academy of Public Administration.

In February 1997, she graduated from the Russian Presidential Academy of Public Administration with a degree in management.

On 11 June 1997, the Federation Council appointed her as a judge of the Constitutional Court of Russia upon President Boris Yeltsin's nomination (vote tally: 104 in favor, 10 against).

In December 2022, amid Russia's invasion of Ukraine, she was added to the European Union sanctions list for "artificially creating the image of the legitimacy of Russia's invasion of Ukraine". She had previously been included in Ukraine's sanctions list.

On 23 May 2025, President Vladimir Putin nominated Zharkova as Deputy President of the Constitutional Court, following sudden death of the previous Deputy President Sergey Mavrin. On June 4, 2025, the Federation Council approved her appointment to the position.

== Awards and honours ==
- Order of Honour (2021)
- Order of Friendship (2015)
- Russian Federation Presidential Certificate of Honour (2011)
- Honoured Lawyer of Russia (2006)
