= Kolyvansky District =

Kolyvansky District Колыванский район (Russian)
- District
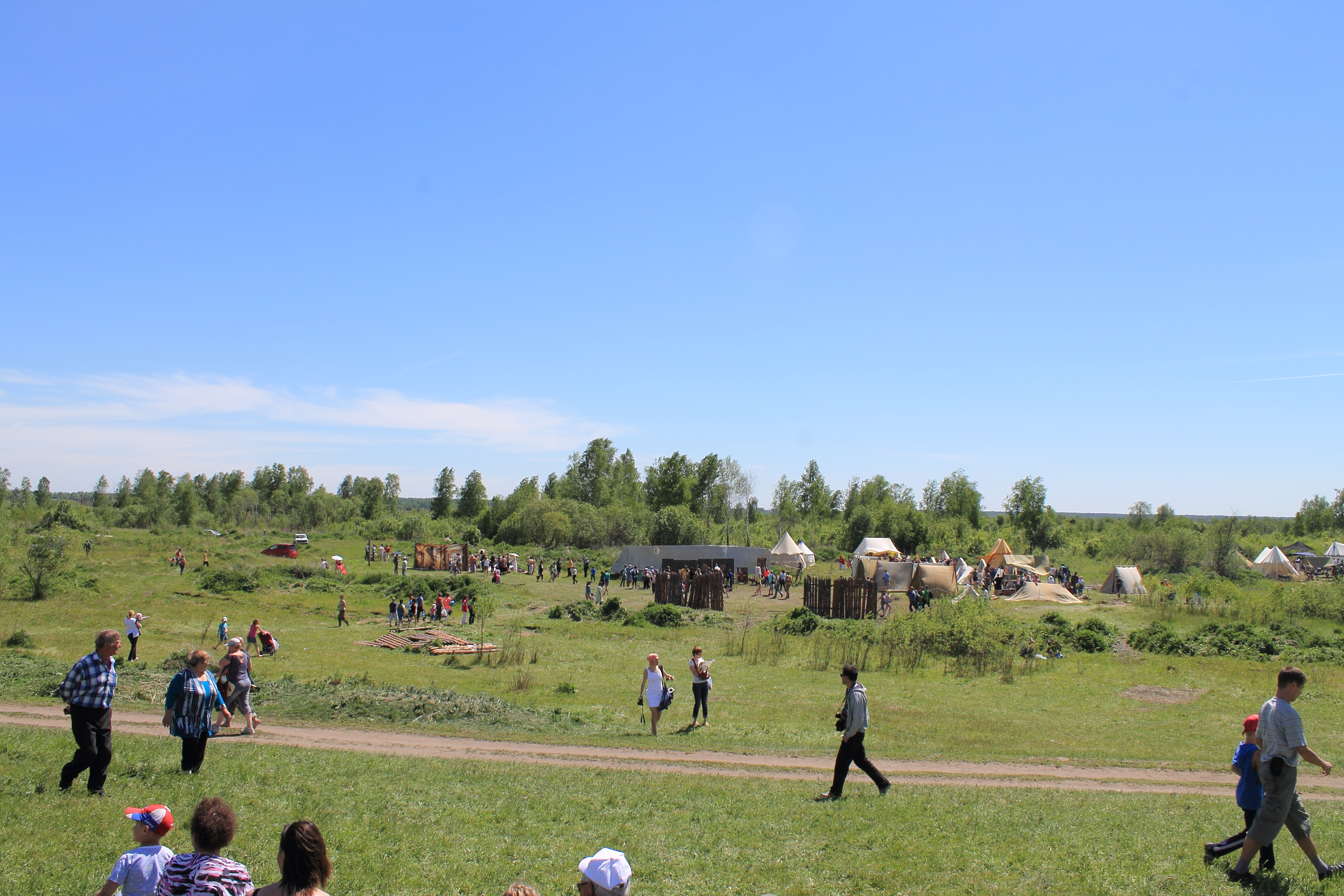
- Outdoor festival, Kolyvansky District

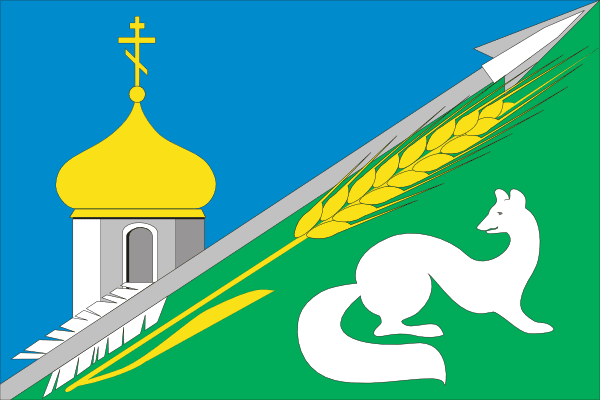
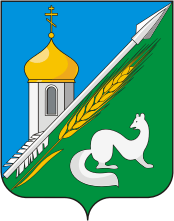
- Flag Coat of arms
- Location of Kolyvansky District in Novosibirsk Oblast
- Coordinates: 55°18′23″N 82°44′21″E
- Country: Russia
- Federal subject: Novosibirsk Oblast
- Administrative center: Kolyvan

Area
  - Total: 10,573 km^{2} (4,082 sq mi)

Population (2010 Census)
  - Total: 24,049
  - Density: 2.2746/km^{2} (5.8911/sq mi)
  - Urban: 49.2%
  - Rural: 50.8%

Administrative structure
  - Inhabited localities: 1 urban-type settlements, 58 rural localities

Municipal structure
  - Municipally incorporated as: Kolyvansky Municipal District
  - Municipal divisions: 1 urban settlements, 11 rural settlements
- Time zone: UTC+7 (MSK+4)
- OKTMO ID: 50621000
- Website: http://koluvan.ru/

Kolyvansky District (Russian: Колыва́нский райо́н) is an administrative and municipal district (raion), one of the thirty in Novosibirsk Oblast, Russia. It is located in the northeast of the oblast. The area of the district is 10,573 square kilometers (4,082 sq mi). Its administrative center is the urban locality (a work settlement) of Kolyvan. Population: 24,049 (2010 Census); 25,737 (2002 census); 28,292 (1989 Soviet census). The population of Kolyvan accounts for 49.2% of the district's total population.
