= Bolshoye Krivoshchyokovo =

Bolshoye Krivoshchyokovo Большое Кривощёково
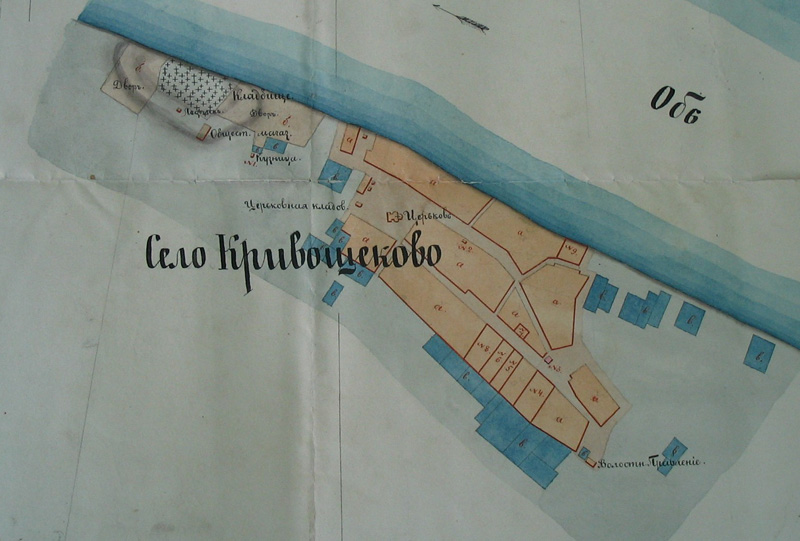
- Krivoshchyokovo in 1893
- Interactive map of Bolshoye Krivoshchyokovo
- Country: Russia

Bolshoye Krivoshchyokovo or simply Krivoshchekovo (Russian: Большое Кривощёково; Big Krivoshchyokovo) was a village located on the left bank of the Ob River (the territory of the modern Leninsky City District of Novosibirsk) north of the mouth of the Tula River. It was founded in the late 17th or early 18th centuries.

== History ==
=== Foundation of the village ===
There are different hypotheses regarding the foundation of the village. Presumably the founder of the village was Tomsk military Krivoshchyok-Krenitsyn. This fact is confirmed by the document of 1716. The novelist-writer Anatoly Sadyrov claims that Kuznetsk commandant Boris Sinyavin, by order of Peter the Great, sent Fyodor Krinitsin nicknamed Krivoshchyok to found a village on the left bank of the Ob River, but he does not provide any serious evidence of this version. Journalist Fyodor Grigoriev believes that Krivoshchyokovo appeared in the summer of 1697, but this version is also not confirmed.

The Krivoshchekovo is also not marked in the "Drawing Book of Siberia" (1699-1701) by Semyon Remezov. Nevertheless, researchers Yury Sergeevich Bulygin and Marina Mikhaylovna Gromyko tried to calculate the age of the village using the questionnaires of the workers of the Kolyvan plants. From these sources it is known that the peasant Dementi Panafindin settled in Krivoshchekov not later than 1708, in the interrogation of the peasant Vankov it is indicated that he was born in 1702 in the village of Maloye Krivoshchyokovo, from which it follows that Bolshoye Krivoshchekovo already existed in 1702 and even "gave birth" Maloye Krivoshchyokovo, which means "it originated not later than the last years of the 17th century".

Gerhard Friedrich Müller in his work "Description of the Kuznetsk Uyezd of Tobolsk Governorate in Siberia in its current state, in September 1734" writes: "The Eighth District, which belongs to Chaussky Ostrog, includes up to 50 villages on both sides of the Ob ... The villages here with churches are: 1. Kryvoshchyokova Bolshaya or Nikolskoye Village, on the western bank of the Ob, 3 miles below the mouth of Inya ..."

=== Population ===
The first settlers were mainly Tomsk military people and their descendants. The first inhabitants of the village were Nikita and Stepan Sizikovs, Zinovy and Fyodor Salomatovs, Zinovy Loginov, I. Tulyapsin, V. Tarsky.

According to the first revision of 1719–1721, there were 104 raznochintsy and 22 male peasants in the village. At that time, the village was inhabited by the Chistyakovs, Oshchepkovs, Banshchikovs, Bykovs, Tomilovs, etc. There are about 40 names.

In 1750–1760, 27 families lived in the village: Chistyakovs, Bykovs, Podgorbunskys, Nekrasovs, Tyumentsevs, Paivins, Belousovs, Oshchepkovs, etc.

In the 1820s, the families of the Bulanovs, Oshchepkovs, Barbanshchikovs, Paivins, Chernyshevs and Tomilins disappeared from the village; At the same time, new families appeared: Denisovs, Voronins, Neupokoyevs, Karengins, Filyushevs. At that time, 38 families lived in the village.

In 1842, 42 households were in Krivoshchekovo.

In 1858, 49 yards and 283 residents (143 men) were in the village. Bolshoye Krivoshchyokovo was in 4th place in terms of population among the proto-urban settlements of Novosibirsk (after Erestnaya, Malokrivoshchyokovskaya and Bugrinskaya).

In 1881, 170 peasant households and 30 households of raznochintsys were located in the village.

In 1883–1889, 105–120 households were counted in Krivoshchekovo. At that time, from 200 to 228 men lived here.

By 1890, Big Krivoshchyokovo was the center of the Krivoshchekovskaya Volost. Krivoshchyokovskaya Church became the main religious place for dozens of settlements.

=== Floodings and relocation of residents ===
Various sources indicate that the reason for the disappearance of Krivoshchyokovo was the construction of the Trans-Siberian Railway, but the question of relocation the village appeared earlier.

In 1890, 1891 and 1892, Krivoshchyokovo suffered from three large-scale floods, which destroyed many buildings and food supplies. After the second flood (1891), some families of the village began to move to other places. Some of them settled above the village on the hill (now Gorsky Mikrodistrict), where by 1892 there were already 30 houses. Others settled at the mouth of the Kamenka River on the right bank of the Ob River (one of the first settlers on the right bank was the merchant Cheredov and the peasant A. Rudzinsky who built a mill there).

On August 23, 1892, after another flood, a peasant gathering took place, the residents decided to move the settlement to another territory.

On December 8, 1892, the petition was sent to the General Directorate of the Altai District. The administration did not object to the transfer of the settlement. Residents could settle on the left bank, but it was much more difficult to move to the Kamenka estuary on the right bank of the Ob River.

When the construction of the bridge began, residents began to motivate their desire to move to a new place not only because of floods. The main reason was the railroad now. The construction of the dam from the hill to the Ob, in the opinion of the residents, should have led to permanent floods. The relocation to the mountain on the left bank also did not suit them now, since during the construction of the dam the lake located under the mountain had to fall asleep, from where they took water for their needs.

The village gathering unanimously decided to move to the mouth of the Kamenka. On January 31, 1894, the peasants' requests for resettlement were rejected, moreover, it was decided to demolish their illegal buildings on the right bank. Nevertheless, Krivoshchyokovo people who settled on the right bank ignored the orders of the General Directorate of the Altai Okrug and remained in the same place; In addition, from 1893, builders of the railway bridge and residents from the Krivoshchekovsky Vyselok began to move to them.
