= Sergey Mavrin (judge) =

Russian judge and academic (1951–2025)

- Сергей Маврин
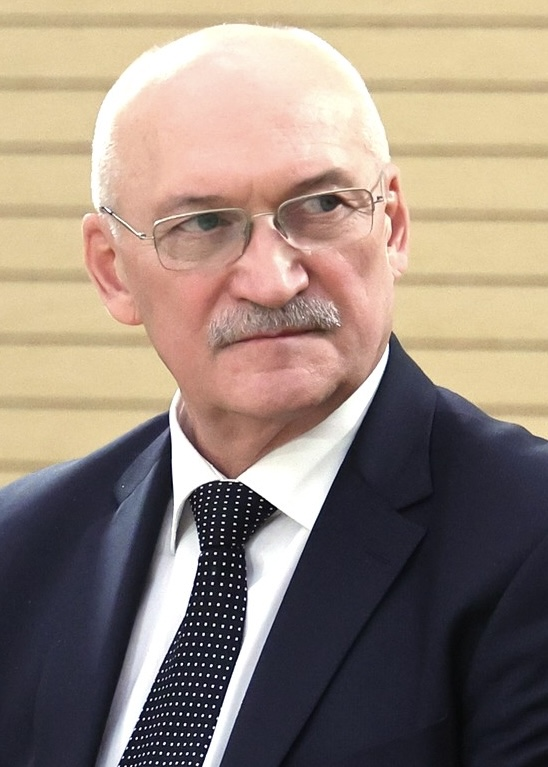
- Mavrin in 2023

Deputy President of the Constitutional Court of Russia
- In office 18 July 2009 – 1 April 2025
- Nominated by: Vladimir Putin
- Preceded by: Vladimir Strekozov
- Succeeded by: Lyudmila Zharkova

Judge of the Constitutional Court of Russia
- In office 25 February 2005 – 1 April 2025
- Nominated by: Vladimir Putin

Personal details
- Born: Sergey Petrovich Mavrin; 15 September 1951 Bryansk, Russian SFSR, USSR
- Died: 1 April 2025 (aged 73) Saint Petersburg, Russia
- Education: Leningrad State University Faculty of Law
- Occupation: Judge; Academic
- Awards: Order of Alexander Nevsky; Order of Honour; Honoured Lawyer of Russia; Honoured Scientist of Russia

Sergey Petrovich Mavrin (Russian: Сергей Петрович Маврин; 15 September 1951 – 1 April 2025) was a Russian jurist and labour law scholar who served as the judge of the Constitutional Court of Russia from 2005 till his death in 2025.

== Life and career ==
Mavrin was born in Bryansk on 15 September 1951. From 1970 to 1972, he completed compulsory military service in the Armed Forces of the Soviet Union. In 1977, he graduated from Leningrad State University Faculty of Law. In 1980, he obtained a Candidate of Sciences degree by writing and defending a thesis titled "Law-Enforcement Activities of Economic Agencies in the Field of Labour Relations".

From 1977 to 2005, he taught at Leningrad (later Saint Petersburg) State University. In 1991, he defended his Doctor of Sciences thesis titled "Labour Management: Theoretical and Legal Aspects."

Since 1996, he served as an expert for the ILO Committee of Experts on the Application of Conventions and Recommendations.

On 25 February 2005, the Federation Council appointed Mavrin as a judge of the Russian Constitutional Court upon the nomination of President Vladimir Putin.

Mavrin died in Saint Petersburg on 1 April 2025, at the age of 73.

== Awards ==
- Honored Lawyer of the Russian Federation (31 May 2007) — for contributions to strengthening the rule of law, protecting the rights and lawful interests of citizens, and many years of conscientious work.
- Honored Scientist of the Russian Federation (19 October 2011) — for contributions to strengthening the rule of law, the development of constitutional justice and legal sciences, ensuring the activities of the Constitutional Court of the Russian Federation, and many years of conscientious work.
- Order of Honour (4 July 2016) — for a significant contribution to the development of constitutional justice in the Russian Federation and many years of fruitful activity.
- Order of Alexander Nevsky (25 October 2021) — for a significant contribution to the development of constitutional justice in the Russian Federation and many years of fruitful activity.
