= Vladimir Zhernakov =

Russian merchant, public figure and politician

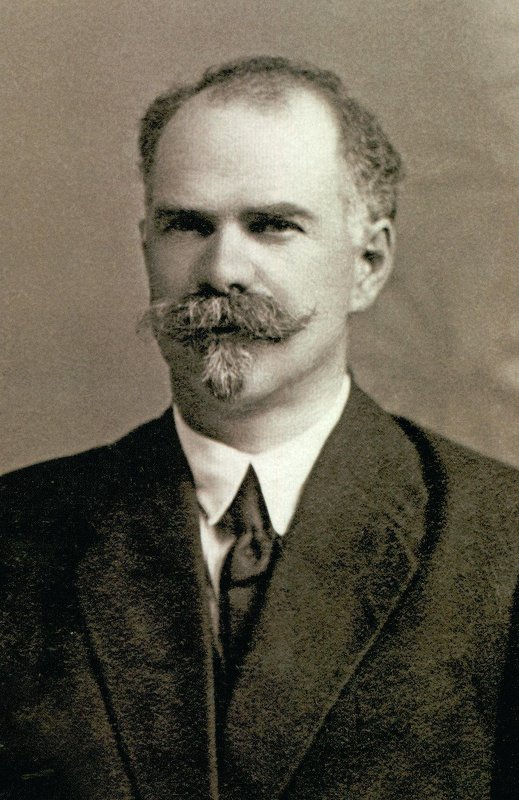

Head of Novonikolayevsk
- In office January 9, 1909 – March 17, 1914

Personal details
- Born: November 2, 1878 Kolyvan, Tomsk Governorate, Russian Empire
- Died: 1943 (aged 64–65) Tomsk
- Citizenship: Russian Empire, Soviet Union
- Education: Saint Petersburg Imperial University

Vladimir Ippolitovich Zhernakov (Russian: Владимир Ипполитович Жернаков; November 2, 1878 – 1943) was a merchant, public figure and politician in the Russian Empire and the Soviet Union. The first city head of Novonikolayevsk from 1909 to 1914.

== Biography ==
Vladimir Zhernakov was born into a merchant family in Kolyvan, Tomsk Governorate.

He graduated from the Faculty of Law of the Saint Petersburg Imperial University.

In 1913, he founded the V. I. Zhernakov & Co Trading House. He also had the shoe store in the Novonikolayevsk City Trade House.

On January 9, 1909, he became the first city head of Novonikolayevsk. On March 17, 1914, he left the post voluntarily.

March 18, 1914, Vladimir Zhernakov became the Honorary Citizen of the City of Novonikolayevsk.

Zhernakov was a supporter of the Novonikolayevsk-Biysk-Semipalatinsk Railway Project. The Altay Railway passed through Novonikolayevsk largely thanks to him, and the city became a major transport hub.

From 1915 to 1916, he was the director of the Novonikolayevsk Flour Milling Partnership.

From 1916 to 1920, he was the director of the Novonikolayevsk Branch of the Siberian Bank.

In 1920, Zhernakov was the technical secretary of the Tomsk Institute of Physical Education.

In 1931, he went to Kharkiv, where he was arrested by the OGPU and sentenced to 5 years for membership in the Cadet Party and public activities during the Civil War. Soon the term was reduced from 5 to 3 years.

Vladimir Zhernakov probably died in 1943.

He was rehabilitated in 1991.

== Bibliography ==
- Маранин И. Ю., Осеев К. А. (2014). Новосибирск: Пять исчезнувших городов. Книга I. Город-вестерн. Новосибирск: Свиньин и сыновья. pp. 252–253. ISBN 978-5-98502-146-2.
- Ламин В. А. (2003). Энциклопедия. Новосибирск. Новосибирск: Новосибирское книжное издательство. pp. 304–305. ISBN 5-7620-0968-8.
