= Kolyvan, Novosibirsk Oblast =

Kolyvan Колывань
- Urban-type settlement
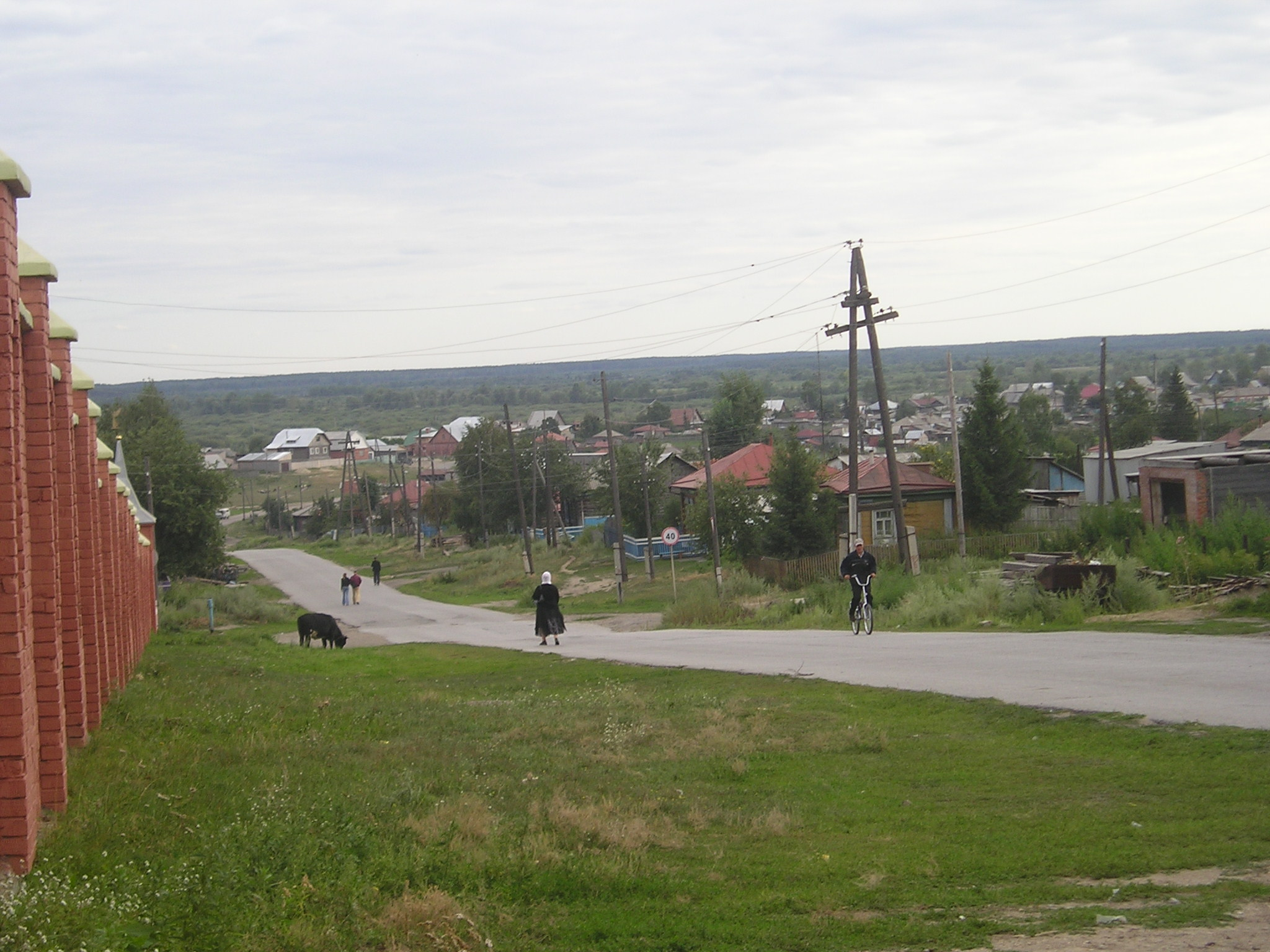
- View of Kolyvan

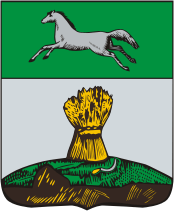
- Coat of arms
- Interactive map of Kolyvan
- Location of Kolyvan Kolyvan (Novosibirsk Oblast)
- Coordinates: 55.305°N 82.745°E
- Country: Russia
- Federal subject: Novosibirsk Oblast
- Administrative district: Kolyvansky District
- Founded: 1797 (Julian)
- Elevation: 123 m (404 ft)

Population (2010 Census)
  - Total: 11,842
  - Estimate (2025): 12,322 (+4.1%)
- Time zone: UTC+7 (MSK+4)
- Postal code: 633160–633169
- OKTMO ID: 50621151051

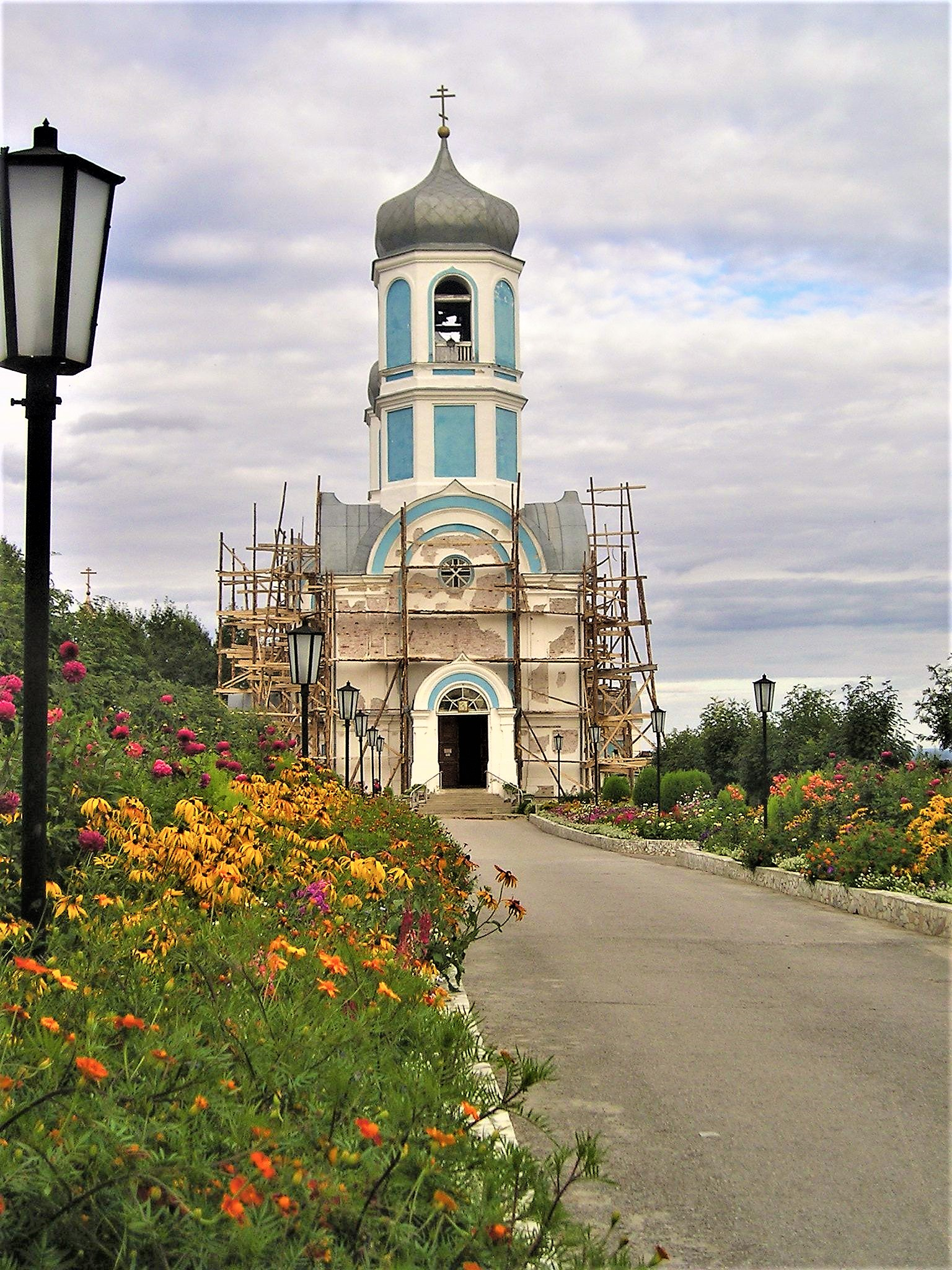
Kolyvan church

Kolyvan (Russian: Колыва́нь) is an urban locality (an urban-type settlement) and the administrative center of Kolyvansky District of Novosibirsk Oblast, Russia, located on the Ob River 40 kilometers (25 mi) to the north of Novosibirsk. Population: 11,842 (2010 census); 10,947 (2002 census); 10,589 (1989 Soviet census).

== History ==
Until the 1890s, Kolyvan was the commercial center of the surrounding area. During the construction of the Trans-Siberian Railway in the 1890s, there were plans to route the railroad through Kolyvan and Tomsk. However, Nikolai Garin-Mikhailovsky, the engineer responsible for routing the railroad in the area, decided that a site at the village of Krivoshchyokovo, some 40 kilometers (25 mi) upstream from Kolyvan, would be much more suitable for bridge construction. The chosen location is where the Ob floodplain is narrowest, and the only area where both, the river banks and the river bed, were solid rock, capable of supporting a railroad crossing. Despite the protests of Kolyvan and Tomsk merchants, Garin-Mikhailovsky's southern route was approved by Alexander III in 1892.

The bridge was built at Krivoshchekovo; the new city of Novo-Nikolayevsk (later renamed Novosibirsk) arose around the bridge, and eventually became Siberia's largest city, meanwhile Kolyvan stagnated.

== Culture ==
The majority of the log houses in Kolyvan are over two hundred years old, making the settlement a historical monument in itself.

Works by Kolyvan craftsmen are exhibited in the Hermitage Museum in St. Petersburg.

Local attractions include a museum of local history and a Russian Orthodox convent.

== Architecture ==
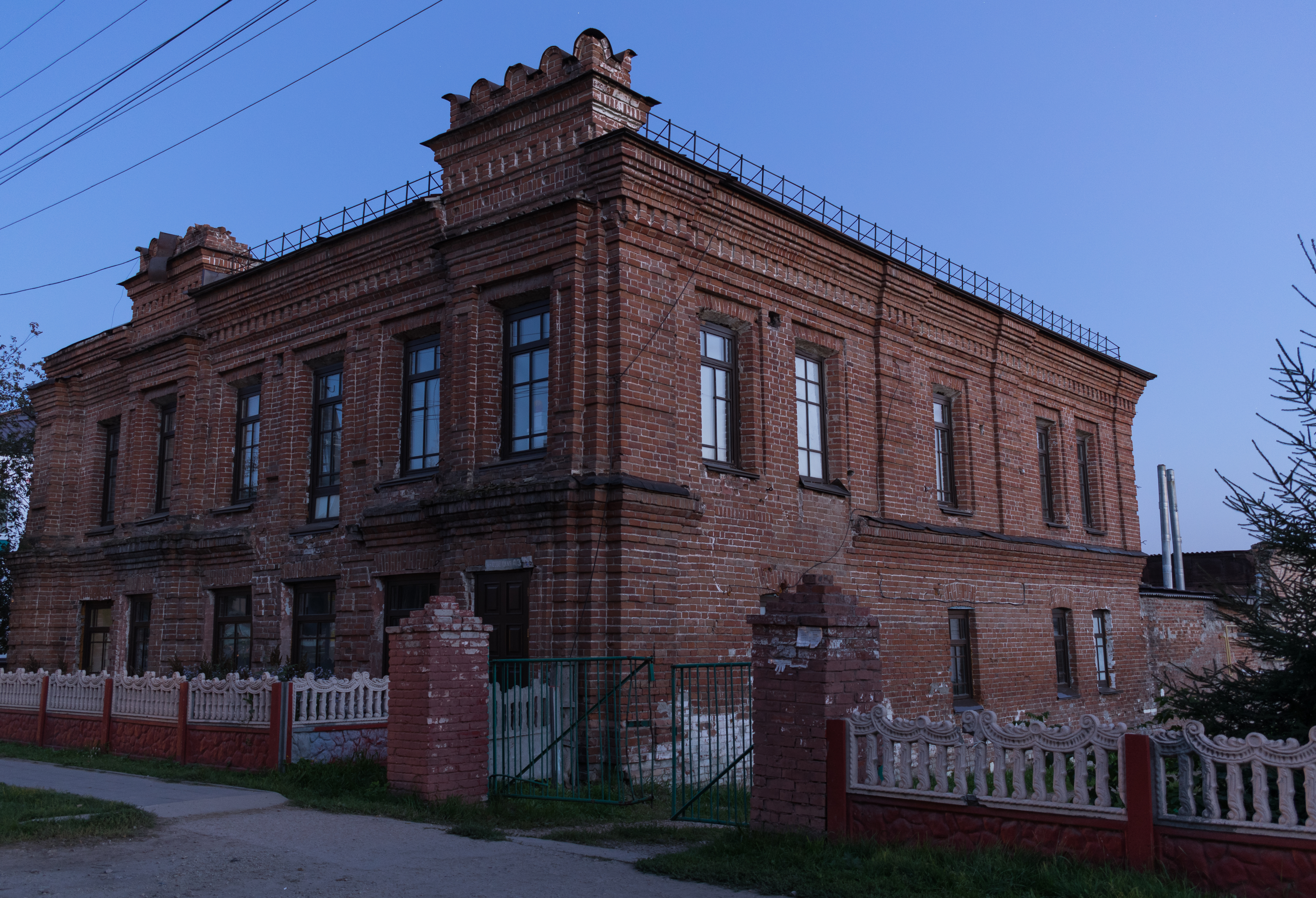
Krivtsov House

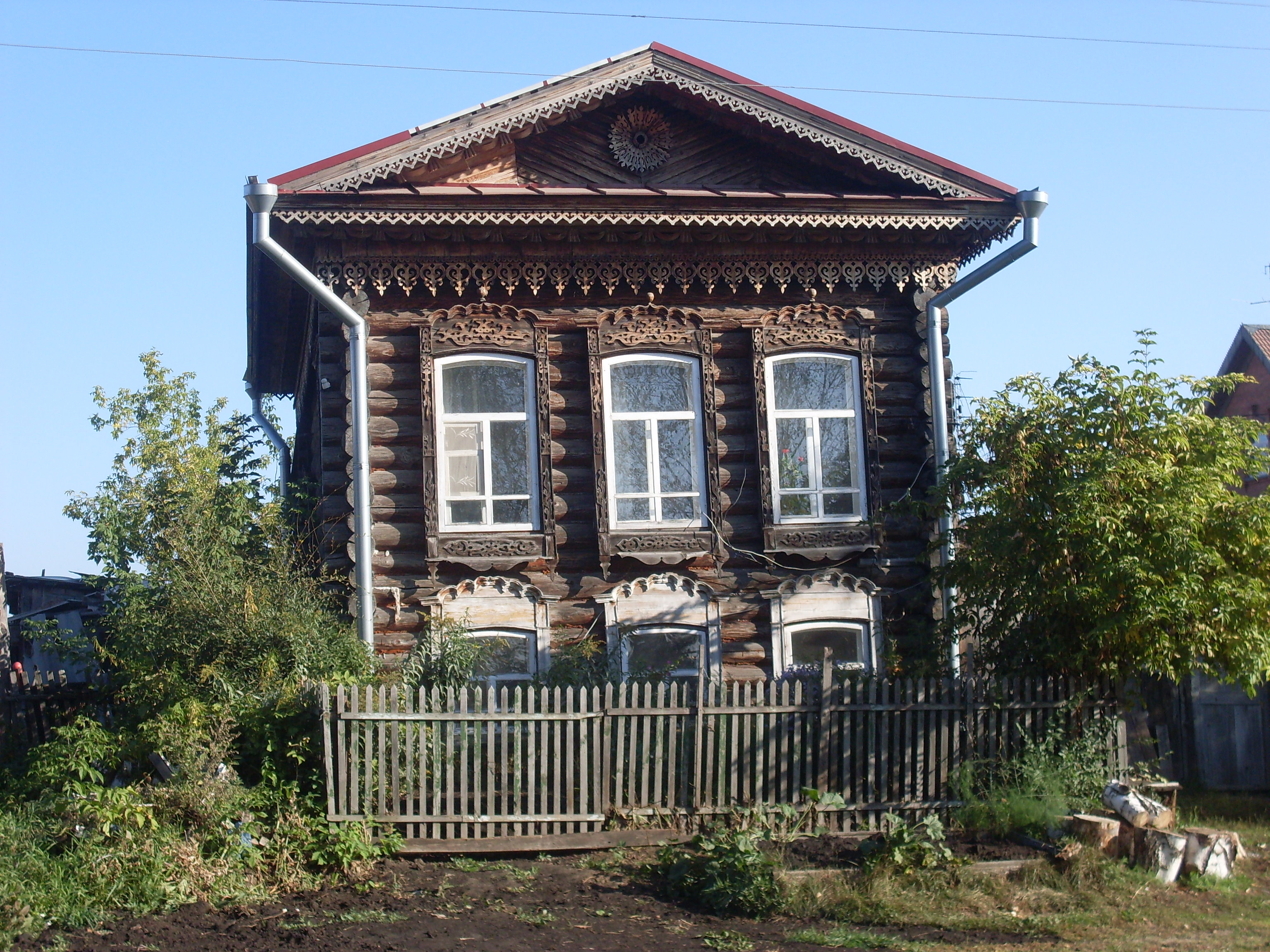

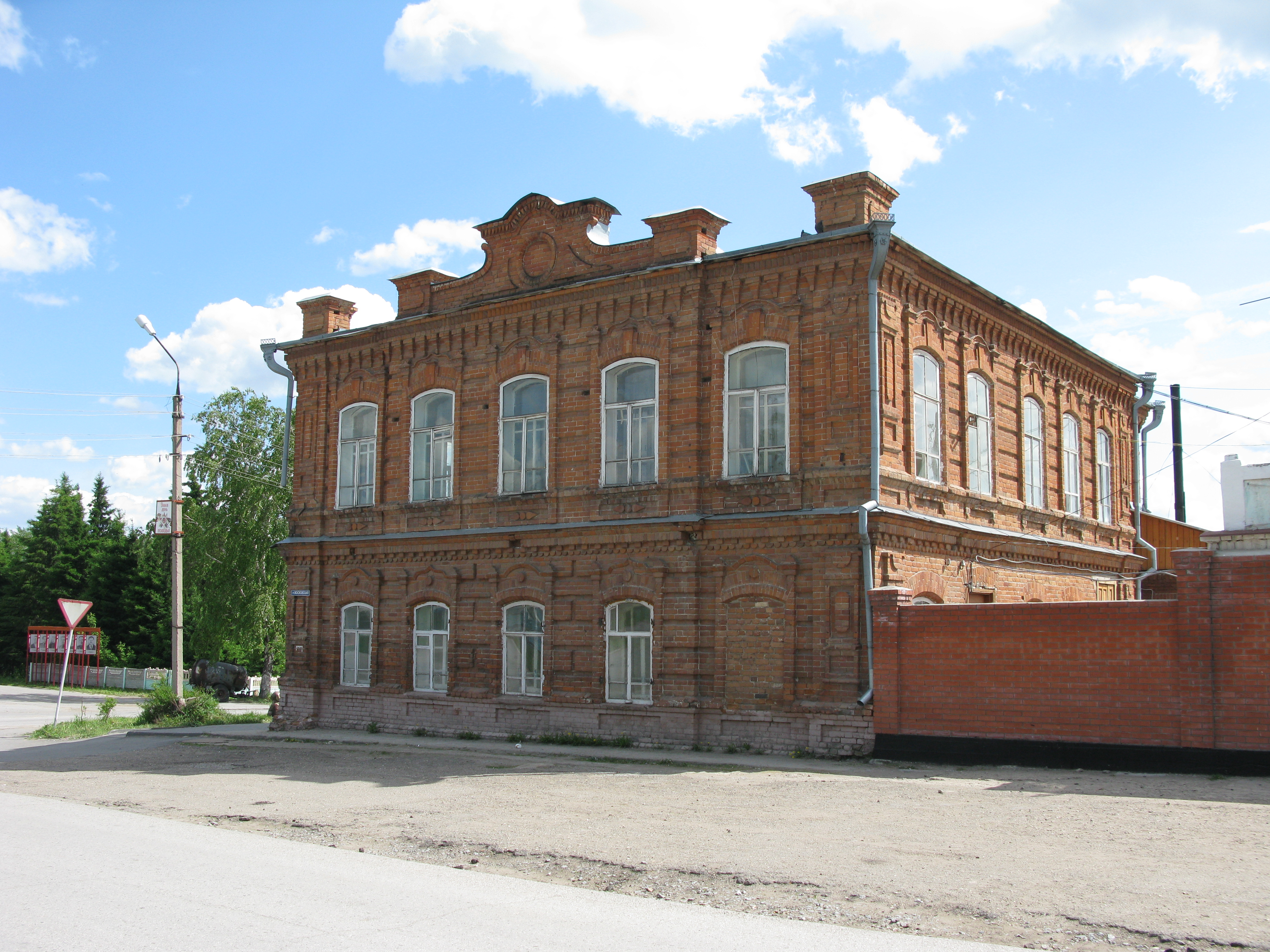
Orlov House

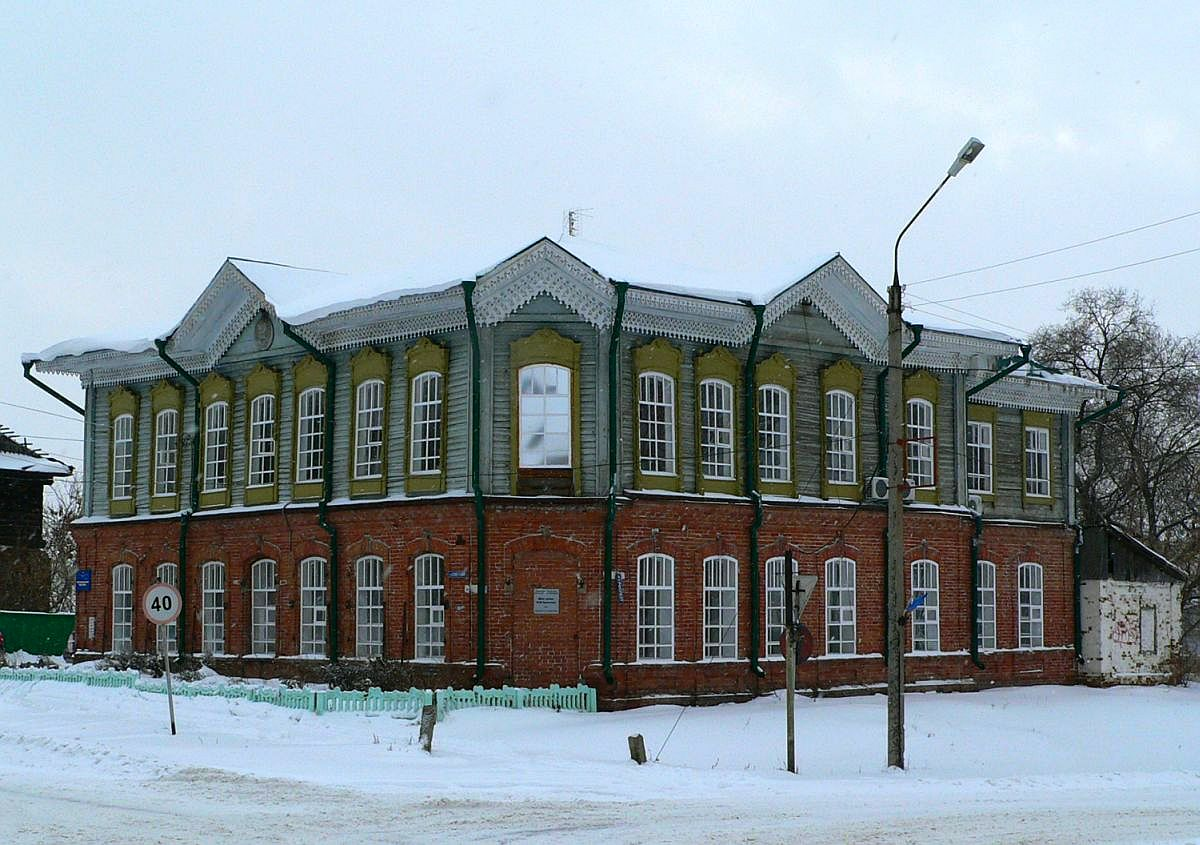
Krotkov House

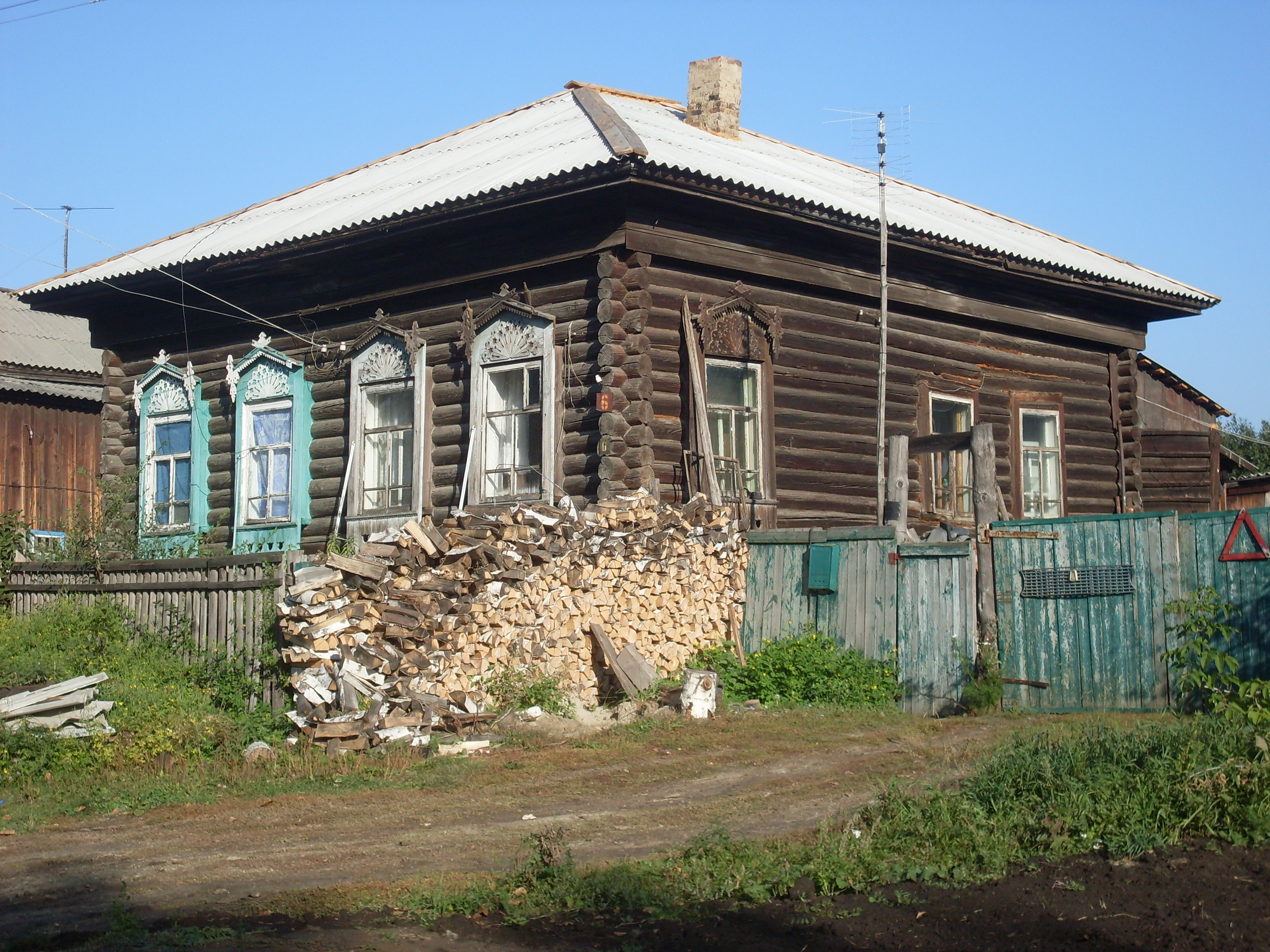

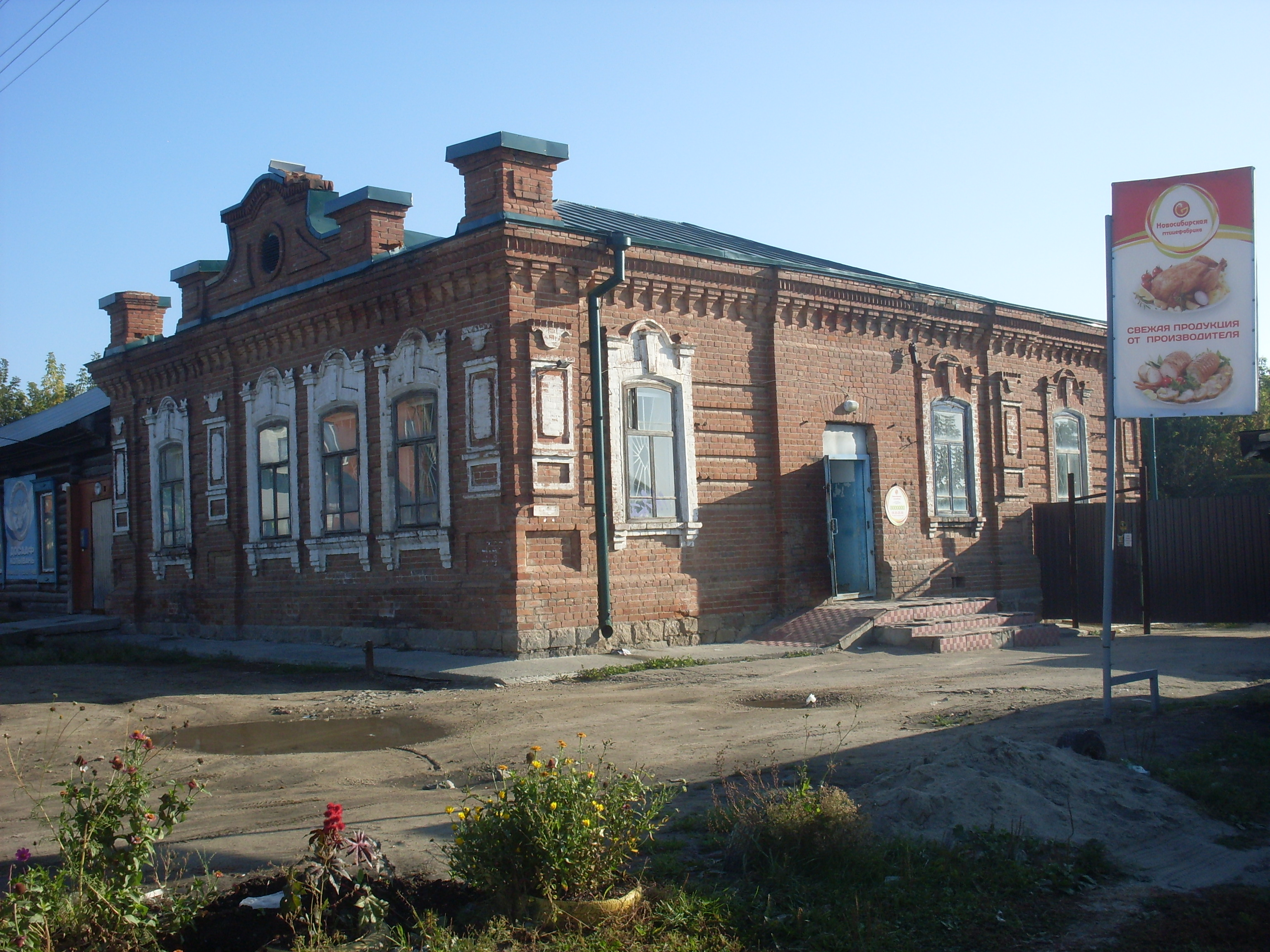

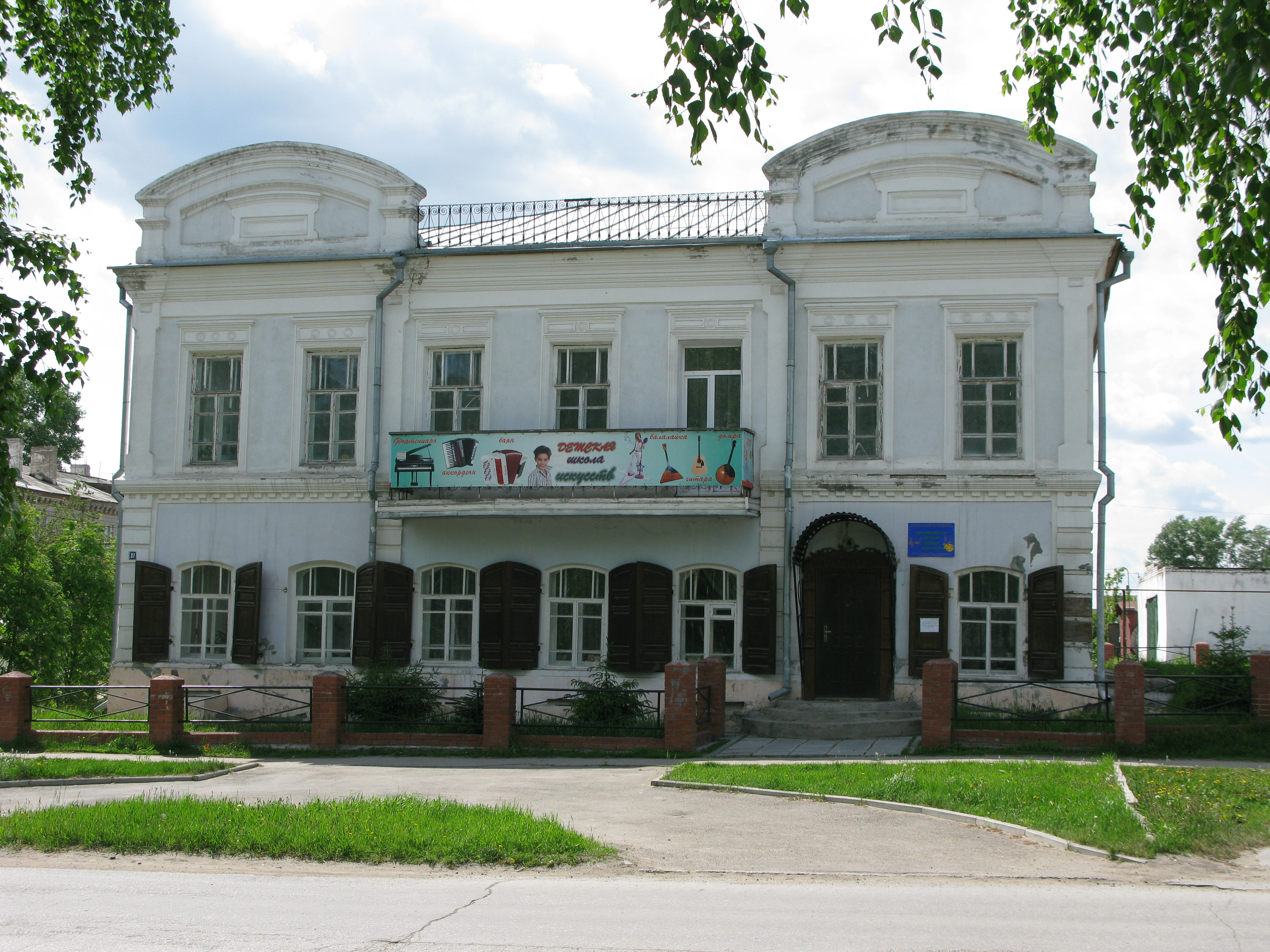

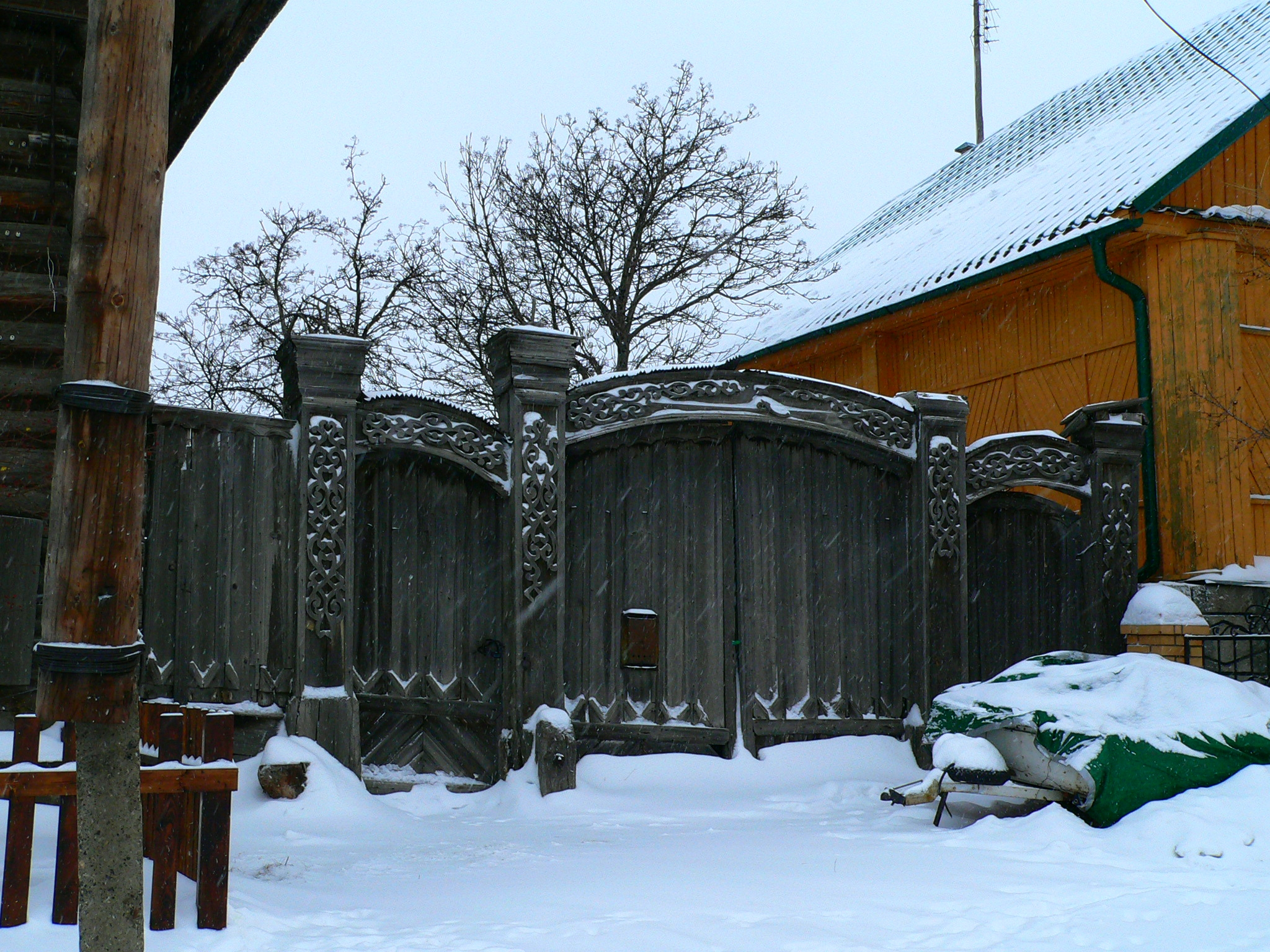

== Notable residents ==
- Vladimir Zhernakov was a Russian merchant, public figure and politician, serving as the first city head of Novonikolayevsk, from 1909 to 1914.
