= Boris Yeltsin Presidential Library =

Coordinates: 59°56′09″N 30°18′04″E

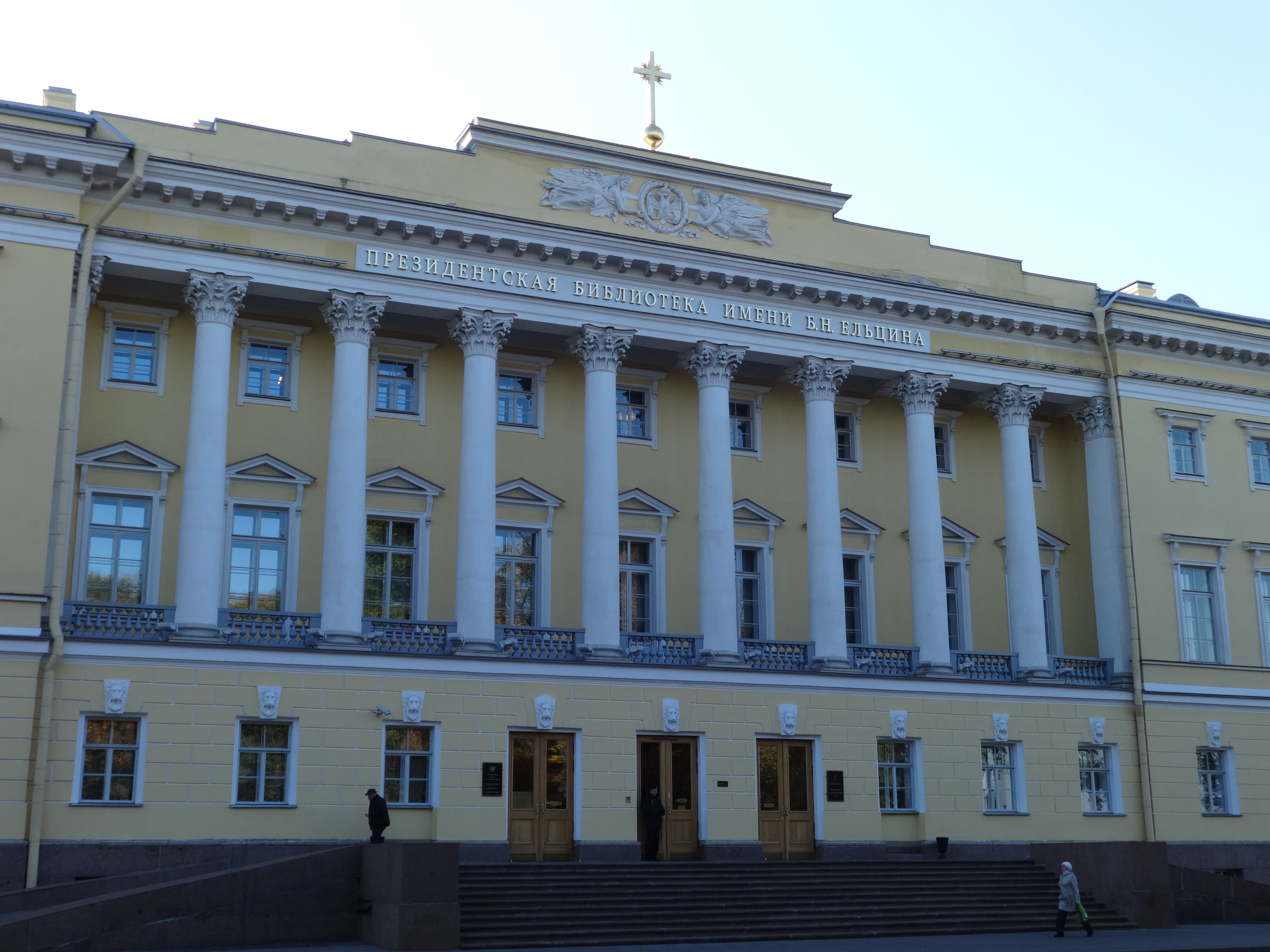
Boris Yeltsin Presidential Library

Boris Yeltsin Presidential Library (Russian: Президентская библиотека имени Б. Н. Ельцина, romanized: Prezidentskaya biblioteka imeni B. N. Yel'tsina) is one of the three national Libraries in Russia. Located in St. Petersburg, its focus is on electronic collections on all topics Russian, not just the life of its namesake. Established in May 2009 by then-president Vladimir Putin, it was named in honour of former president Boris Yeltsin. Unlike other Russian national libraries, which operate under the authority of Ministry of Culture, it is under the Directorate of the President of the Russian Federation.

In November 2014, it announced its intention to start an online encyclopedia, which it dubbed an alternative to Wikipedia. In a statement, the Library said that Wikipedia "...is unable to give detailed and trustworthy information about Russia’s regions and the life of the country."

== See also ==
- The two other national libraries of Russia:
  - Russian State Library, Moscow
  - National Library of Russia, St. Petersburg
- List of libraries in Russia
