= National Library of Russia =

National public library in Saint Petersburg, Russia

The National Library of Russia
- Российская национальная библиотека
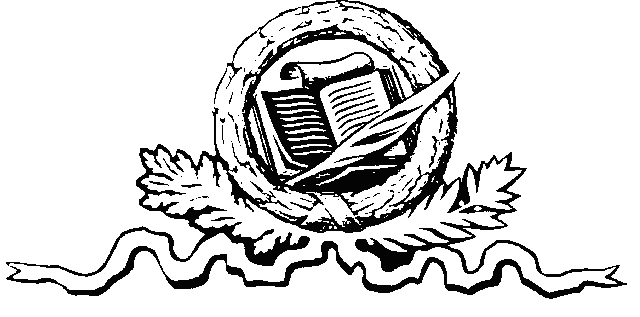

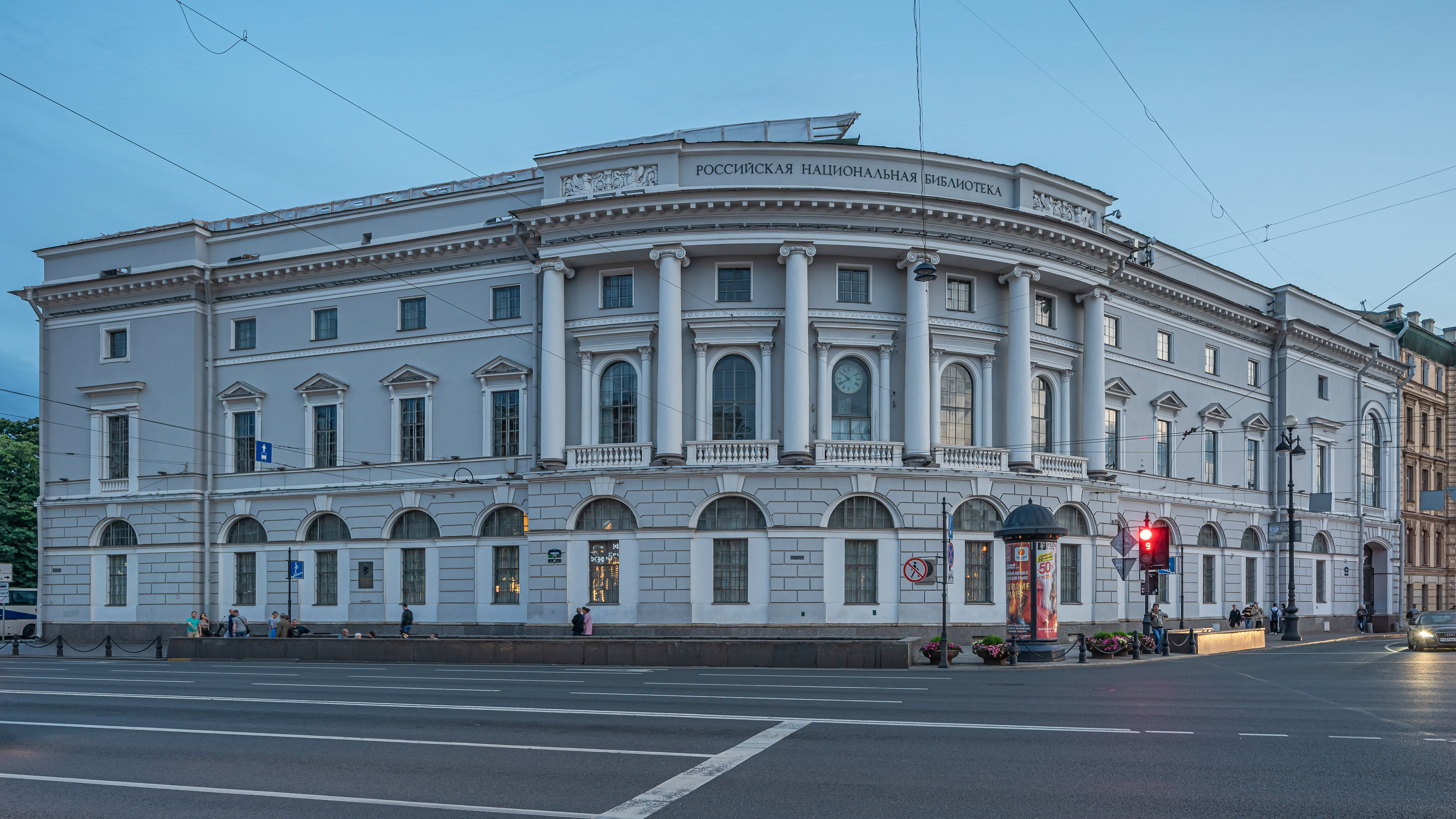
- The 18th-century building of the library faces Nevsky Prospekt
- 59°56′01″N 030°20′08″E
- Location: Saint Petersburg, Russia
- Type: National library
- Established: 1795 (231 years ago)
- Reference to legal mandate: Decree of the Government of the Russian Federation authorizing the Statute of the Federal State Institution "The National Library of Russia" (March 23, 2001)

Collection
- Items collected: Books, journals, newspapers, magazines, official publications, sheet music, sound and music recordings, databases, maps, postage stamps, prints, drawings, manuscripts and media.
- Size: 36,475,000 items (15,000,000 books)
- Criteria for collection: Legal deposit of materials published in Russia; "Rossika": materials about Russia or materials published by the people of Russia residing abroad; selected foreign scholarly publications and other materials.
- Legal deposit: Yes (Legal Deposit Law)

Access and use
- Access requirements: Reading rooms – free. Russian residents must be 14 or older. Foreign visitors are limited by the period of their visa.
- Circulation: 8,880,000 (2007)
- Population served: 1,150,000 (2007)

Other information
- Budget: 569,200,000 RUB ($23,400,000)
- Director: Alexander Vershinin
- Employees: 1,850
- Website: www.nlr.ru/eng/
- Interactive map with main library buildings

The National Library of Russia (NLR, Russian: Российская национальная библиотека, РНБ), located in Saint Petersburg, is the oldest of Russia's three national public libraries. The NLR is currently ranked among the world's major libraries. It has the second biggest library collection in the Russian Federation, a treasury of national heritage, and is the All-Russian Information, Research and Cultural Center. Over the course of its history, the library has aimed for comprehensive acquisition of the national printed output and has provided free access to its collections.

It was known as the Imperial Public Library from 1795 to 1917; Russian Public Library from 1917 to 1925; State Public Library from 1925 to 1992 (since 1932 named after M.Y. Saltykov-Shchedrin); and since 1992 as the National Library of Russia (NLR).

== History ==
=== Establishment ===
The Imperial Public Library was established in 1795 by Catherine the Great. It was based on the Załuski Library, the famous Polish national library built by Bishop Załuski in Warsaw, which had been seized by the Russians in 1794 after the Partitions of Poland.

The idea of a public library in Russia emerged in the early 18th century but did not take shape until the arrival of the Russian Enlightenment. The plan of a Russian public library was submitted to Catherine in 1766 but the Empress did not approve the project for the imperial library until 27 May [O.S. 16 May] 1795, eighteen months before her death. A site for the building was found at the corner of Nevsky Avenue and Sadovaya Street, right in the center of the Russian imperial capital. The construction work began immediately and lasted for almost fifteen years. The building was designed in a Neoclassical style by architect Yegor Sokolov (built between 1796 and 1801).

The cornerstone of the foreign-language department came from the Polish–Lithuanian Commonwealth in the form of Załuski's Library (420,000 volumes), seized in part by the Russian government at the time of the partitions, though many volumes were lost en route to theft by Russian soldiers who sold them for profit. The Polish-language books from the library (numbering some 55,000 titles) were returned to Poland by the Russian SFSR in 1921.

For five years after its foundation, the library was run by Comte Marie-Gabriel-Florent-Auguste de Choiseul-Gouffier. The stocks were arranged according to a specially compiled manual of library classification. In 1810, Emperor Alexander I approved Russia's first library law stipulating, among other things, that two legal copies of all printed matter in Russia be deposited in the library.

The library was to be opened for the public in 1812 but, as the more valuable collections had to be evacuated because of Napoleon's invasion, the inauguration was postponed for two years.

Under Count Alexander Stroganov, who managed the library during the first decade of the 19th century, the Rossica project was inaugurated, a vast collection of foreign books touching on Russia. It was Stroganov who secured for the library some of its most invaluable treasures, namely the Ostromir Gospel, the earliest book written in the Old East Slavic dialect of Church Slavonic (which was to eventually develop into the Russian language), and the Hypatian Codex of the Russian Primary Chronicle. He, along with other bibliophiles, also reviewed the collection of manuscripts and letters brought by Peter P. Dubrowsky (1754–1816) who had stayed in the diplomatic service for more than 20 years outside the fatherland. Based on the review, Stroganov recommended to Alexander I the creation of a manuscript depot. Alexander decreed the creation of such a department on February 27, 1805, and named Dubrowsky as the first keeper of the depot of manuscripts.

=== 1814–1917 ===
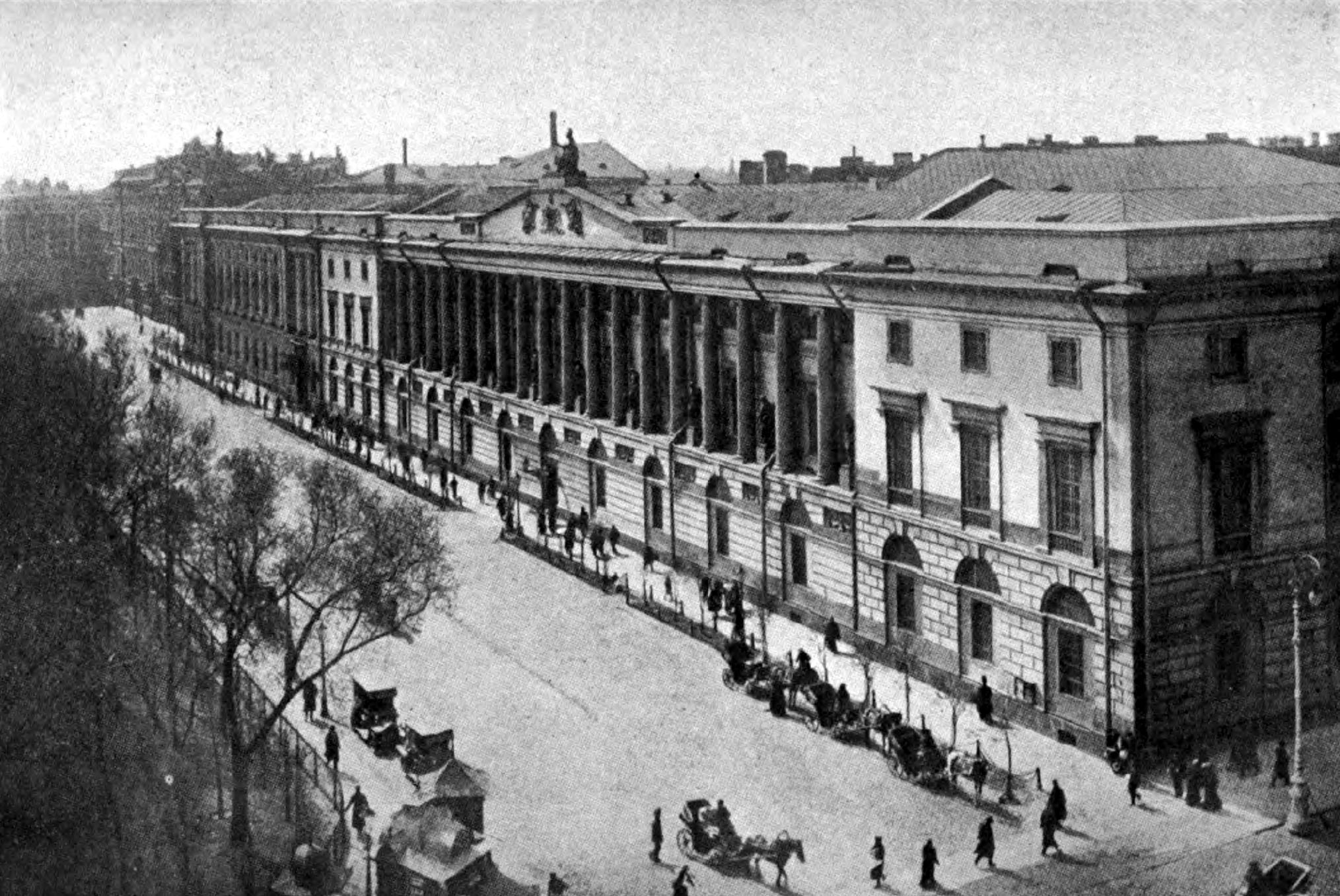
The Neoclassical building on the Nevsky Avenue.

The Imperial Public Library was inaugurated on 14 January [O.S. 2 January] 1814 in the presence of Gavrila Derzhavin and Ivan Krylov. The library's third, and arguably most famous, director was Aleksey Olenin (1763–1843).

Librarianship progressed to a new level in the 1850s. The reader community grew several times, enlarged by common people. At the same time, many gifts of books were offered to the library. Consequently, collection growth rates in the 1850s were five times higher than the annual growth rate of five thousand new acquired during the first part of the century. In 1859, Vasily Sobolshchikov prepared the first national manual of library science for the library entitled Public Library Facilities and Cataloguing.

The influx of new visitors required a larger reading room in the new building closing the library court along the perimeter (designed by Sobolshchikov, built in 1860–62).

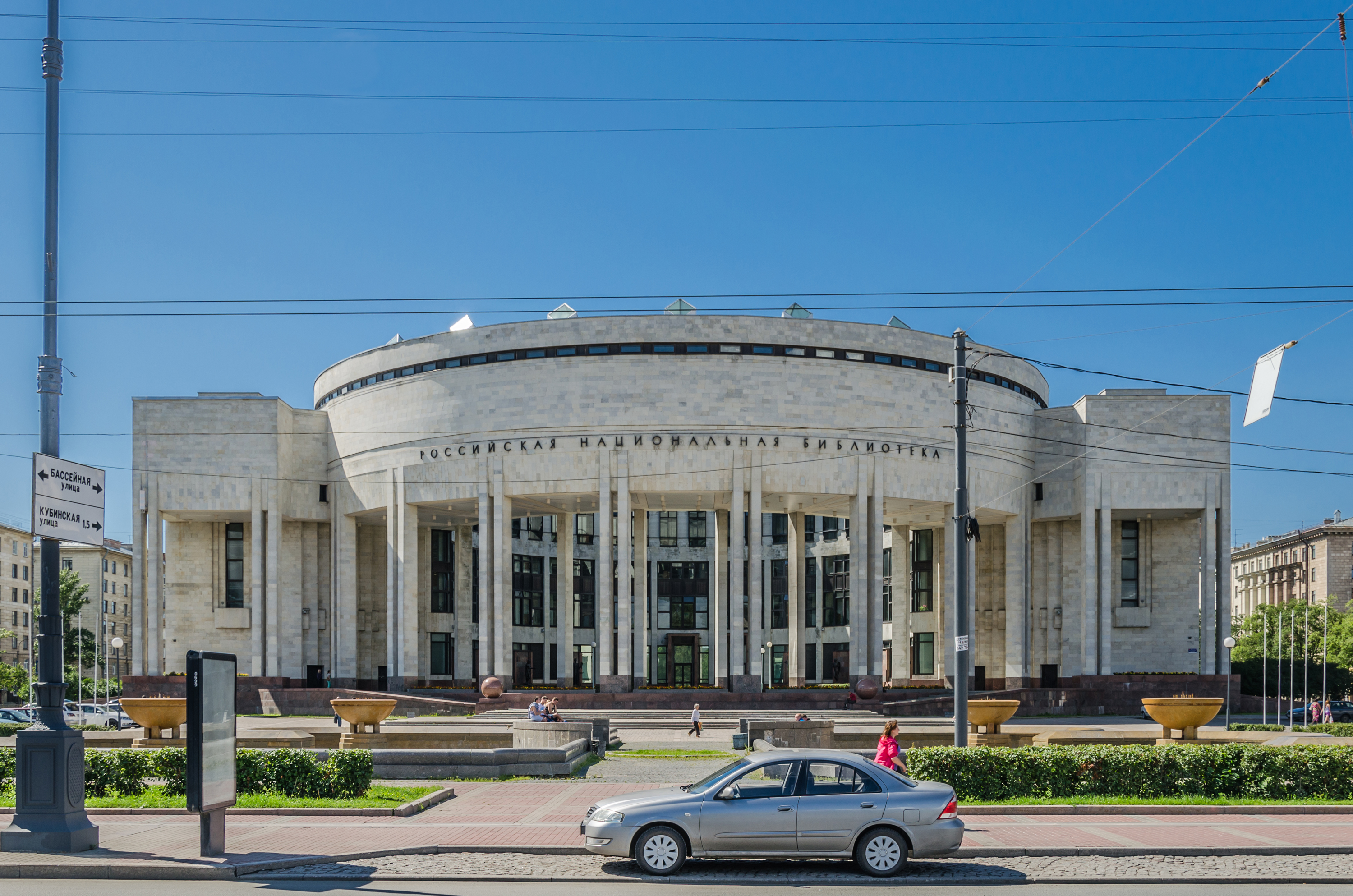
The new building on the Moskovsky Avenue

From 1849 to 1861 the library was managed by Count Modest von Korff (1800–76), who had been Alexander Pushkin's school-fellow at the Lyceum. Korff and his successor, Ivan Delyanov, added to the library's collections some of the earliest manuscripts of the New Testament (the Codex Sinaiticus from the 340s), the Old Testament (the so-called Leningrad Codex), and one of the earliest Qur'ans (the Uthman Qur'an from the mid-7th century).

=== 20th century ===
In the aftermath of the Russian Revolution, the institution was placed under the management of Ernest Radlov and Nicholas Marr, although its national preeminence was relinquished to the Lenin State Library in Moscow. The library was awarded the Order of the Red Banner of Labour in 1939 and remained open during the Siege of Leningrad.

The National Library began a large-scale digitization project at the end of the 20th century by taking part in the Library of Congress project Meeting on Frontiers. By 2012 the library, along with its counterpart in Moscow, had around 80,000 titles available electronically.

=== Looting during World War II ===
After the end of the Second World War, millions of German art objects, books and archival materials were brought to the Soviet Union. Some of these cultural assets were returned to the former GDR in the 1950s. However, to this day, among other things, there are still more than 200,000 works of art, three million books and archival material with a length of three shelf kilometers of German provenance in Russia.

Highlights of the library

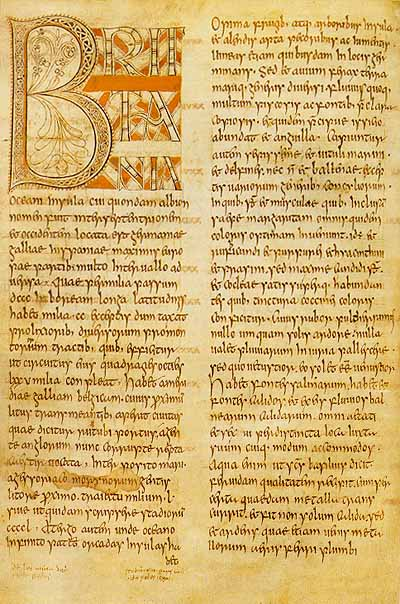
St. Petersburg Bede (746)

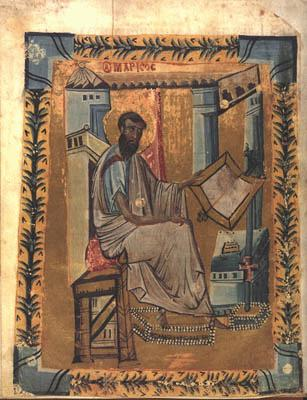
Trebizond Gospel (10th century)

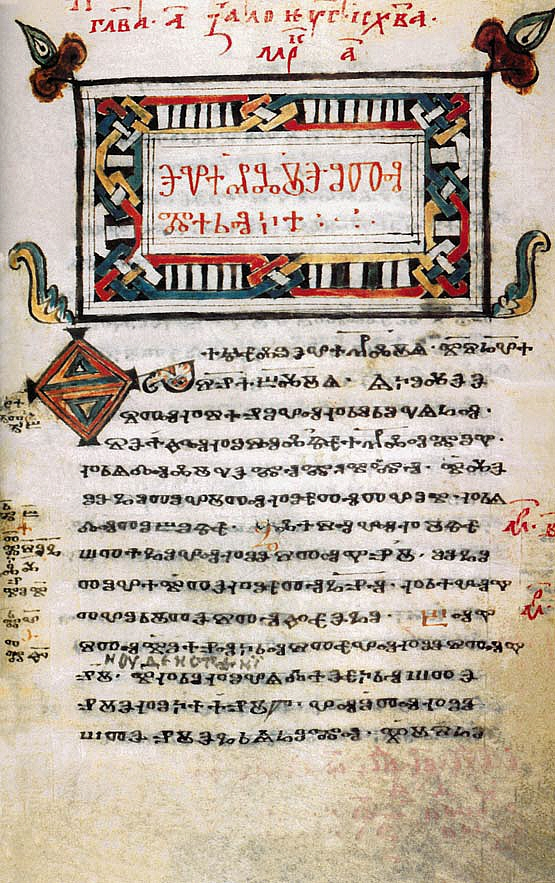
Codex Zographensis (c. 1000)

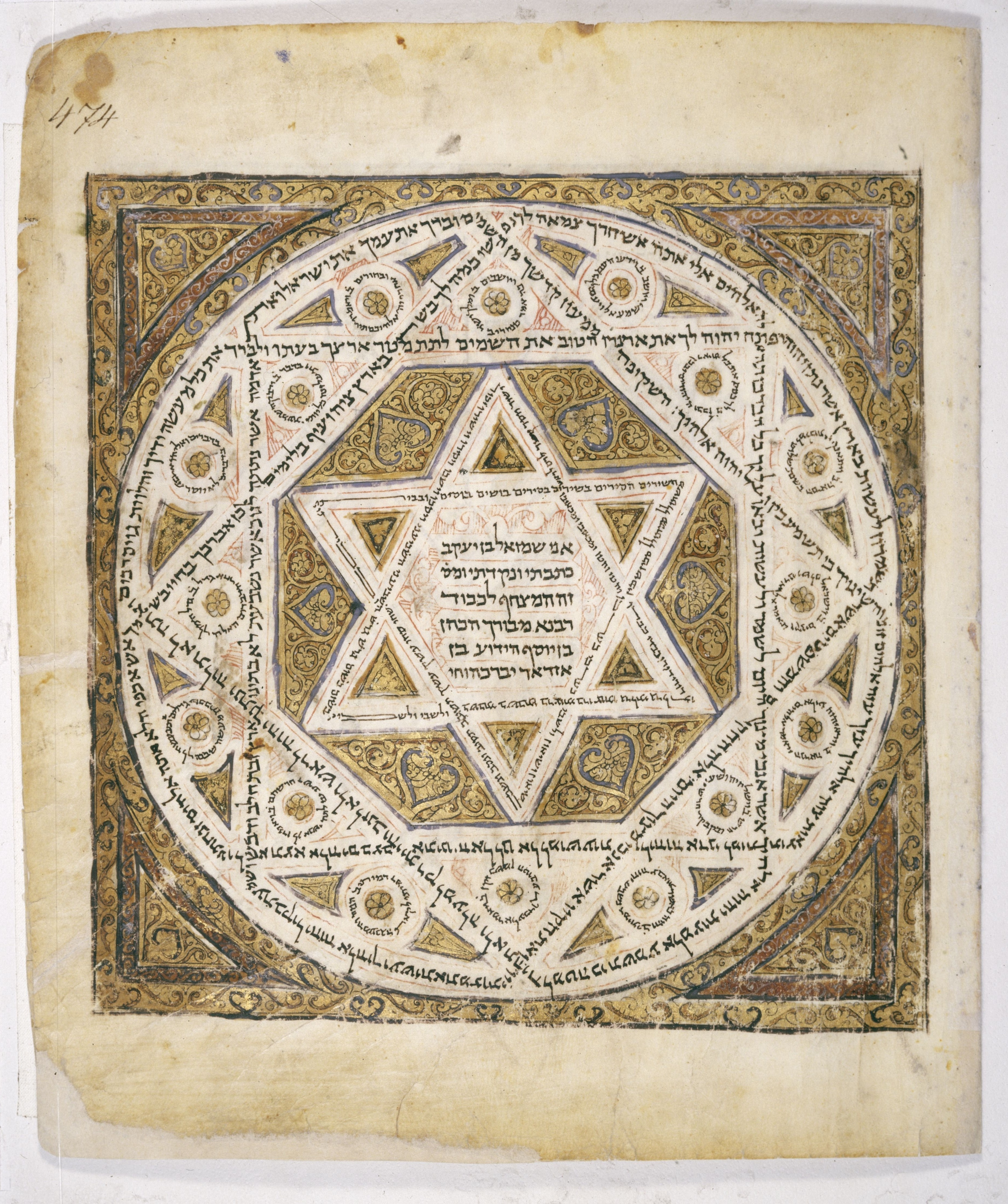
Leningrad Codex (c. 1008)

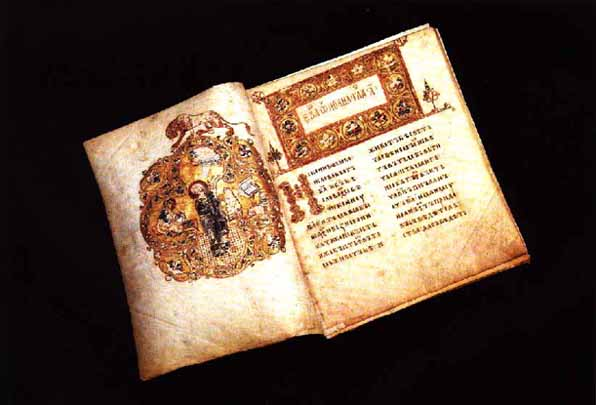
Ostromir Gospel (1056)

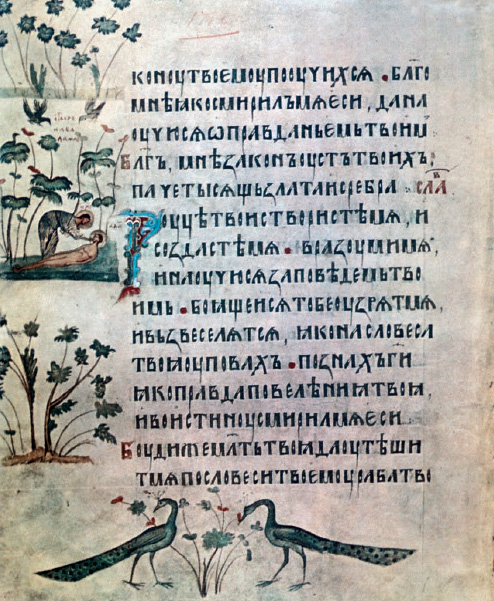
Spiridon Psalter (1397)

Guyart de Moulin's Bible Historiale (1350s)

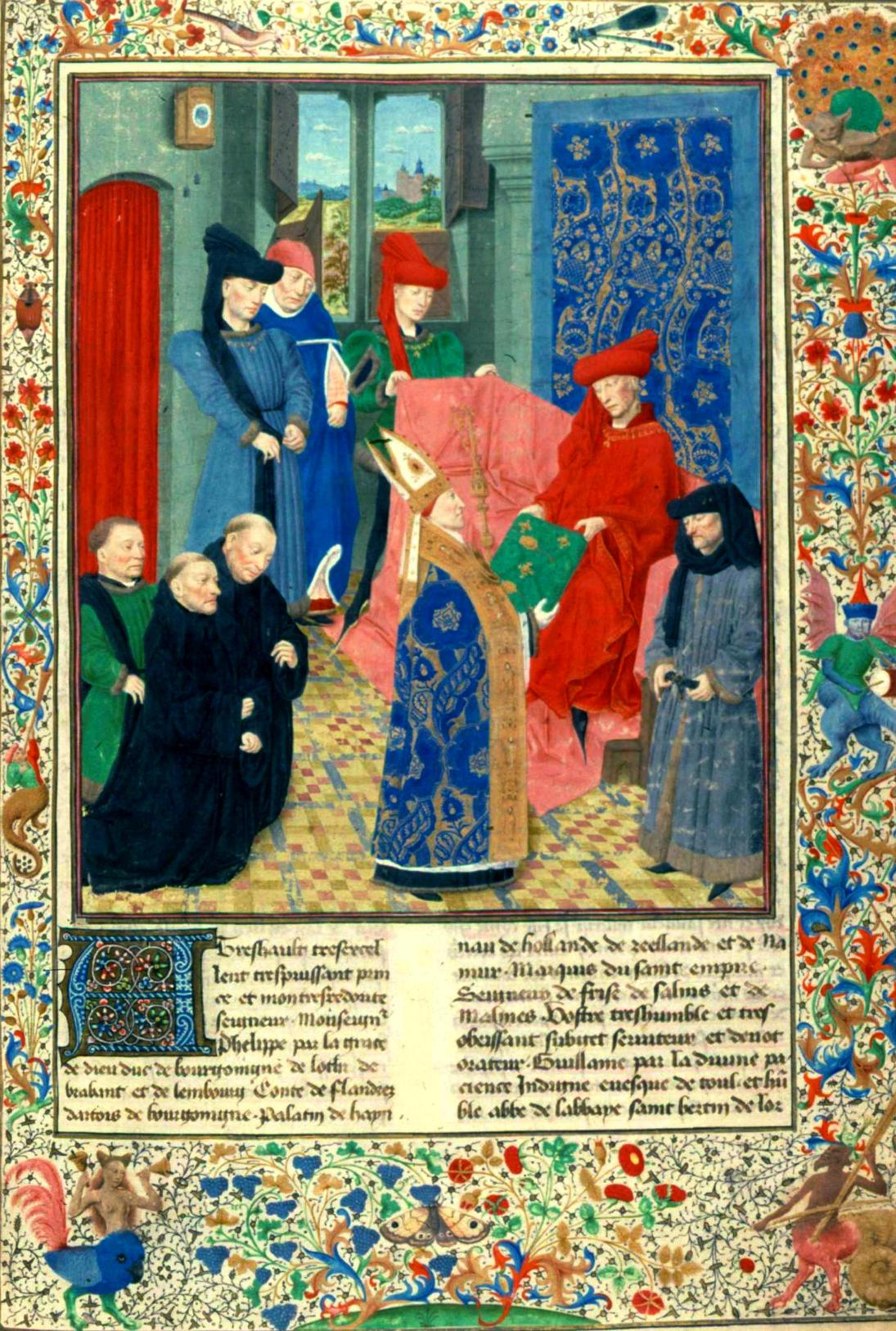
Simon Marmion's Grandes Chroniques de France (1450s)

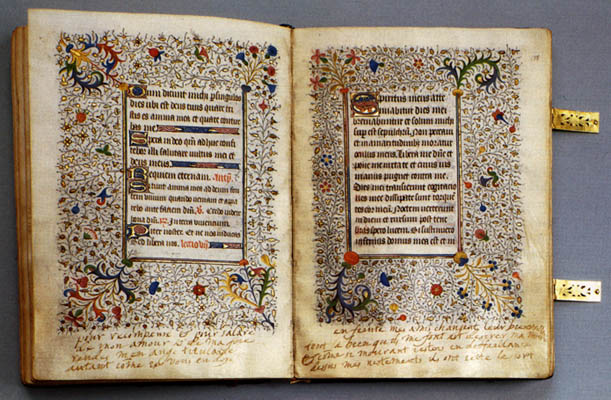
Breviary of Mary Stuart (1490s)

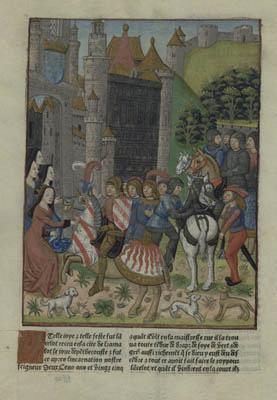
Lancelot du Lac (c. 1500)

== See also ==
- Russia has two additional national libraries:
  - Russian State Library, Moscow
  - Boris Yeltsin Presidential Library, St. Petersburg
- List of libraries in Russia

== Bibliography ==
- Stuart, Mary. "'A Potent Lever for Social Progress': The Imperial Public Library in the Era of the Great Reforms". Library Quarterly (1989): 199–222. JSTOR 4308377.
- Stuart, Mary. "The Evolution of Librarianship in Russia: The Librarians of the Imperial Public Library, 1808–1868". Library Quarterly (1994): 1–29. JSTOR 4308895.
- Stuart, Mary. "Creating Culture: The Rossica Collection of the Imperial Public Library and the Construction of National Identity". Libraries & culture (1995): 1–25. JSTOR 25542708.
- Stuart, Mary. "Creating a National Library for the Workers' State: The Public Library in Petrograd and the Rumiantsev Library Under Bolshevik Rule". Slavonic and East European Review 72.2 (1994): 233–258. JSTOR 4211475.

=== In Russian ===
- История Государственной ордена Трудового Красного Знамени Публичной библиотеки имени М. Е. Салтыкова-Щедрина. — Ленинград: Лениздат, 1963. — 435 с., [15] л. ил.
- История Библиотеки в биографиях её директоров, 1795—2005 / Российская национальная библиотека. — Санкт-Петербург, 2006. — 503, [1] с.: ил. — ISBN 5-8192-0263-5.
