= Mikhail Zenkevich =

Russian-Soviet poet, writer, translator, and journalist

- Born: Mikhail Aleksandrovich Zenkevich; May 21, 1886; Nikolayevsky Gorodok, Saratovsky Uyezd, Saratov Governorate, Russian Empire
- Died: September 14, 1973 (aged 87); Moscow, Soviet Union
- Education: Saint Petersburg State University
- Occupations: Poet, translator, editor
- Writing career
- Period: 1906–1972
- Genres: Poetry, translation
- Movement: Acmeism

Mikhail Aleksandrovich Zenkevich (Russian: Михаи́л Алекса́ндрович Зенке́вич, 21 May 1886 – 14 September 1973) was a Russian and Soviet poet, writer, translator and journalist. A prominent figure in the Acmeist movement of the Russian poetry, he is also regarded as one of the founders of the Soviet school of poetry translation.

== Biography ==
Mikhail Zenkevich was born in the rural area of Saratov region. His father Aleksandr Osipovich Zenkevich taught mathematics at the Marinsky Agricultural Community College, mother Evdokiya Semyonovna (née Neshcheretova) was a gymnasium teacher.

In 1904, after graduating the First Saratov Gymnasium, Mikhail Zenkevich traveled abroad and spent two years in Germany, studying in the Universities of Jena and Berlin. In 1906 he published his first three poems in the Saratov-based Zhizn i shkola (Life and School) magazine. In 1907 Zenkevich moved to Saint Petersburg and started writing for magazines Vesna, Sovremenny mir, Obrazovanye and Zavety. In 1910 he met Nikolay Gumilyov, who helped him to publish some of his poetry in the Apollon magazine (No. 9, 1910).

In 1911 Zenkevich joined the newly formed First Workshop of Poets and became part of the Acmeist circle, striking close friendship with Vladimir Narbut. Around this time he enrolled into the Saint Petersburg University's law faculty which he graduated from in 1915. Before that, in 1912, Zenkevich's debut book of poetry The Wild Mantle (Дикая порфира) in which the author explored the possibilities of 'expressing science through poetry', came out. It had strong resonance, with poets like Nikolay Gumilyov, Valery Bryusov, Vyacheslav Ivanov, Sergey Gorodetsky and Boris Sadovskoy giving it positive reviews. Zenkevich's verse explores nature-philosophical themes along with details borrowed from geology, paleontology, and biology, sometimes with anti-aesthetic images or graphic violence. Together with Narbut he is described as a "left-wing" Acmeist, closer to Russian futurism.

In December 1917 Zenkevich returned to his native Saratov to join the stuff of the local Saratovskye Izvestia newspaper. In 1918 his second collection The Fourteen Poems came out. A year later Zenkevich joined the Red Army as a volunteer and served there for three years first as a secretary for court-martial, then the tribunal official at the Caucasian Front HQ where he also lectured on infantry weaponry. He continued to write and in 1921 published Tanks' Harvest (Пашня танков). Two more collections, Lyrics and Porphybagr (the latter combining the Wild Porphyry material with the poems from the new collection called Under the Meat Porphyry) were prepared for publication but never issued. In the twenties he wrote The Muzhik Sphinx (1921–1928) book of memoirs, published only in 1978.

Up until 1923 Zenkevich lived in Saratov where he worked for ROSTA and gave lectures (on Alexander Blok, Velimir Khlebnikov and others). In 1923 he moved to Moscow and joined first the Rabotnik Prosveschenya magazine (as a secretary) than Goslitizdat as a foreign literature editor. In 1923 his first translation (from Victor Hugo) was published. Several books of poetry (Under the Steamer's Nose, 1926 and The Late Flight, 1928 among them) followed. The Wright brothers biography written by Zenkevich came out in 1934 in the Lives of Distinguished People series. In 1934–1936 he worked in Novy Mir as a poetry department editor. In 1936 Zenkevich co-founded the Poets of America anthology and since then concentrated on translating the classic and contemporary American poets. This resulted in a series of anthologies: From the American Poetry (1846), Poets of the XX Century. Foreign poetry translated my M.Zenkevich (1965), American Poetry in M.Zenkevich’s translations (1969).

As the Great Patriotic War started, Zenkevich, unfit for service for health reasons, was evacuated to Chistopol but often went to the frontlines to give poetry recitals, and worked for the radio. In 1947 he joined the CPSU. In 1960 he visited the United States to meet some of the poets whose work he translated, including Mike Gold and Robert Frost. After the War Zenkevich published several books of translated poetry, as well as his own work, Through Thunderstorms of Years (1962) and The Selected Poems (1973).

Mikhail Zenkevich died on September 14, 1973, in Moscow.

== Selected bibliography ==
- The Wild Porphyry (Дикая порфира, 1912)
- Fourteen Poems (Четырнадцать стихотворений, 1918)
- Tanks' Harvest (Пашня танков, 1921)
- Under the Steamer's Nose (Под пароходным носом, 1926)
- The Late Flight (Последний пролёт, 1928)
- Through Thunderstorms of Years (Сквозь грозы лет, 1962)
