= Nikita Lomagin =

Russian historian

Nikita Andreevich Lomagin
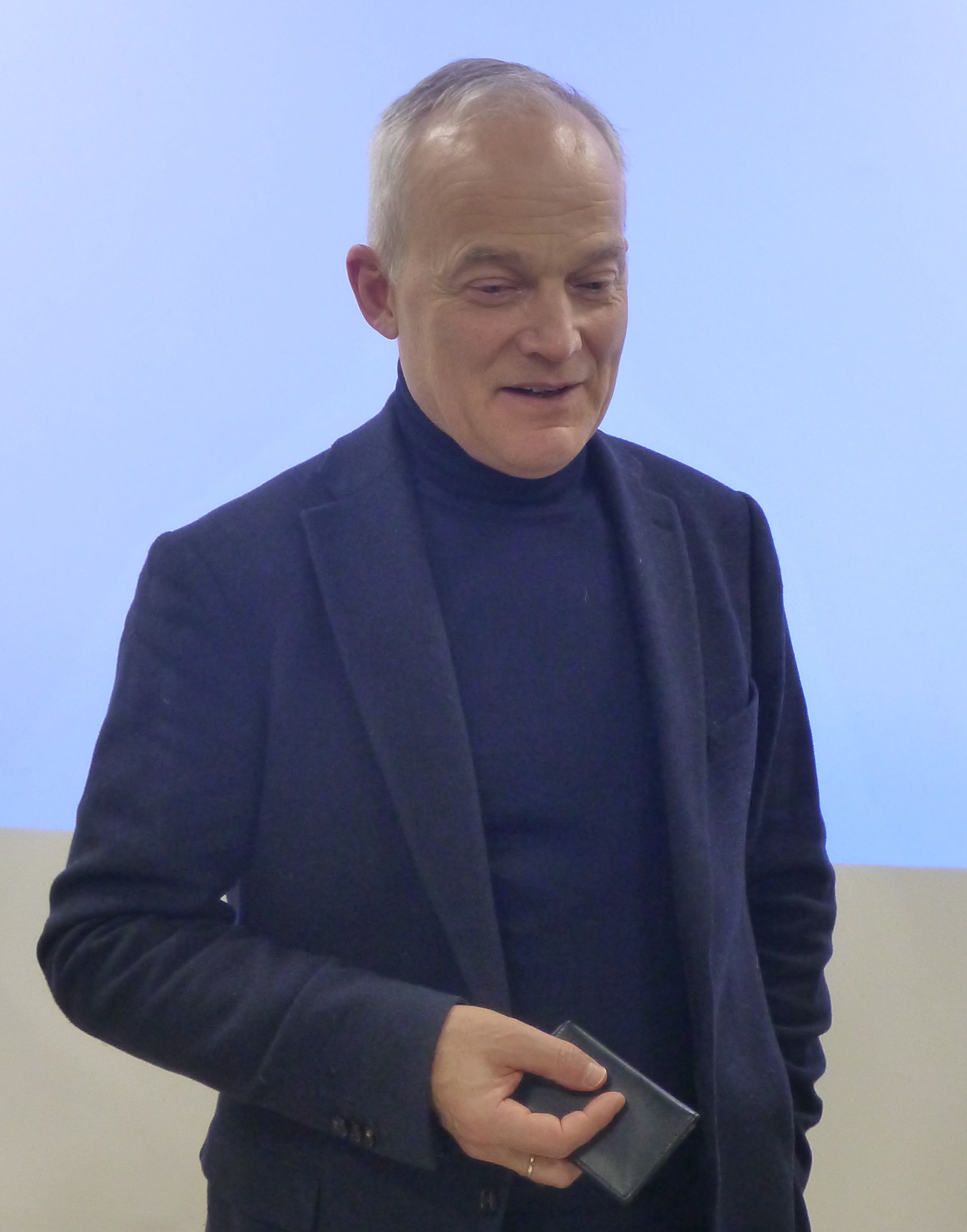
- Lomagin in 2019
- Born: June 4, 1964 (age 62); Leningrad, USSR
- Citizenship: Russia
- Occupations: tutor, historian
- Known for: Studies of the Blockade of Leningrad

Academic background
- Education: PHD in History
- Alma mater: Leningrad State University
- Thesis: (1989, 2005)

Academic work
- Discipline: History of Russia
- Institutions: Saint Petersburg State University

Nikita Andreevich Lomagin (Russian: Никита Андреевич Ломагин) is a Russian historian, economist and international relations expert, known for his comprehensive studies of socio-economic aspect of the Siege of Leningrad.

== Academic career ==
Nikita Lomagin graduated from the Faculty of History of the Saint-Petersburg State University in 1986, briefly worked for the Russian Academy of Sciences and then returned to his alma mater to join the newly-founded Faculty of International Relations as professor of Global Policy. In 1997 he also graduated from the Faculty of Law of his University, since 1999 - professor of Global Economics in the Department of Economics of his alma mater. In 2000 he joined European University at Saint-Petersburg where from 2014 onwards he has served as a professor in the Department of Political Science at EUSP, Academic Director of the ENERPO program, Director of the ENERPO Research Center.

Main subject of his studies in the Russian history is the Blockade of Leningrad during the Great Patriotic War. Lomagin's first thesis considered the counter-measures of the Communist Party against the German Nazi propaganda in Leningrad under siege. The thesis accomplished in 1989 was classified for official use only due to its content considered then politically-sensitive. His second thesis that earned him a doctoral degree was accomplished in 2005 and concerned the political control over the population of besieged Leningrad.

Lomagin extensively worked in the archives on the topic of the Nazi blockade of Leningrad published "In the Vise of Hunger" - a collection of documents of German military and paramilitary forces as well as of the Soviet NKVD (People's Commissariat for Internal Affairs) that reflect the German aims, plans and actions that concern the besieged city, and the situation inside the starving Leningrad, on its supply routes and on the frontline. The book also features the letters that the city dwellers exchanged with their relatives and friends living on the non-occupied Soviet territory. Based on the revealed documents, Lomagin concludes that despite the tremendous death toll of the starving, but resisting Leningrad the perspective of surrender to the German Wehrmacht would have brought far overreaching human losses and strategic obstacles to the allied war effort against the Axis.

In 2016 he was appointed the official opponent to the thesis of a revisionist historian Kirill Alexandrov that was dedicated to the phenomenon of Soviet collaborators to the occupying Nazi regime.

Other areas of scientific interest for Lomagin are international economic and political relations of Russia, international cooperation in the Arctic region.

== Selected publications ==
=== Books ===
- International Organizations: Theory and Practice of Operation. Saint-Petersburg, 2000, in Russian (Международные организации: теория и практика деятельности. СПб: СПбГУ, 2000)
- The Unknown Blockade. Moscow, 2002, in Russian (Неизвестная блокада: М.-СПб, Нева, 2002)
- The Leningrad Blockade, 1941—1944: A new documentary History from the Soviet Archives. New Haven & London: Yale University Press, 2012 - co-authored with Bidlack Richard
- In the Vise of Hunger. Leningrad Blockade in the German and Soviet Official Documents and in Letters of the City Dwellers, Saint-Petersburg, 2014, in Russian (В тисках голода. Блокада Ленинграда в документах германских спецслужб, НКВД и письмах ленинградцев. СПб: Аврора-дизайн, 2014)

=== Articles ===
- A Cold Peace between Russia and the West: Did Geo-economics Fail? In: The Russian Challenge to the European Security Environment. Palgrave Macmillan, 2017
- Foreign Policy Preferences of Russia’s Energy Sector: A Shift to Asia? In: Russia, Eurasia and the New Geopolitics of Energy. Confrontation and Consolidation. Palgrave Macmillan, 2015
- Medvedev’s European Security Treaty Proposal: Building a Euro-Atlantic Security Community? // Russia and European Security. Ed. by Roger E. Kanet and Maria Raquel Freire. Dordrecht, The Netherlands: Republic of Letters Press, 2012. pp. 225–260.
- The Russian Perception of Europe and Its Implications for Russia EU Relations//A Resurgent Russia and the West: The European Union, NATO and Beyond/Ed.Roger E. Kanet. The Netherlands/USA: Republic of Letters Publishing, 2009. 240 p. Pp. 55-70.
- The Soviet Union in the Second World War // A Companion to Russian History / Ed. A. Gleason. Great Britain: Wiley-Blackwell, — 2009. — 586 p. pp. 386–413.
- Fälschung and Wahrheit. Die Blockade in der russischen Historriographie. In: Die Leningrader Blockade. Der Krieg, die Stadt and der Tod. // Berliner Osteuropa Info. (Informations dienst des Ost-Europa Instituts der Freien Universität Berlin, 2011. Vol. 61. Jahrgang, № 8-9/August–September 2011. pp. 23–49, in German
