= Continuation War =

Finnish war against the Soviet Union (1941–1944)

- Part of the Eastern Front of World War II
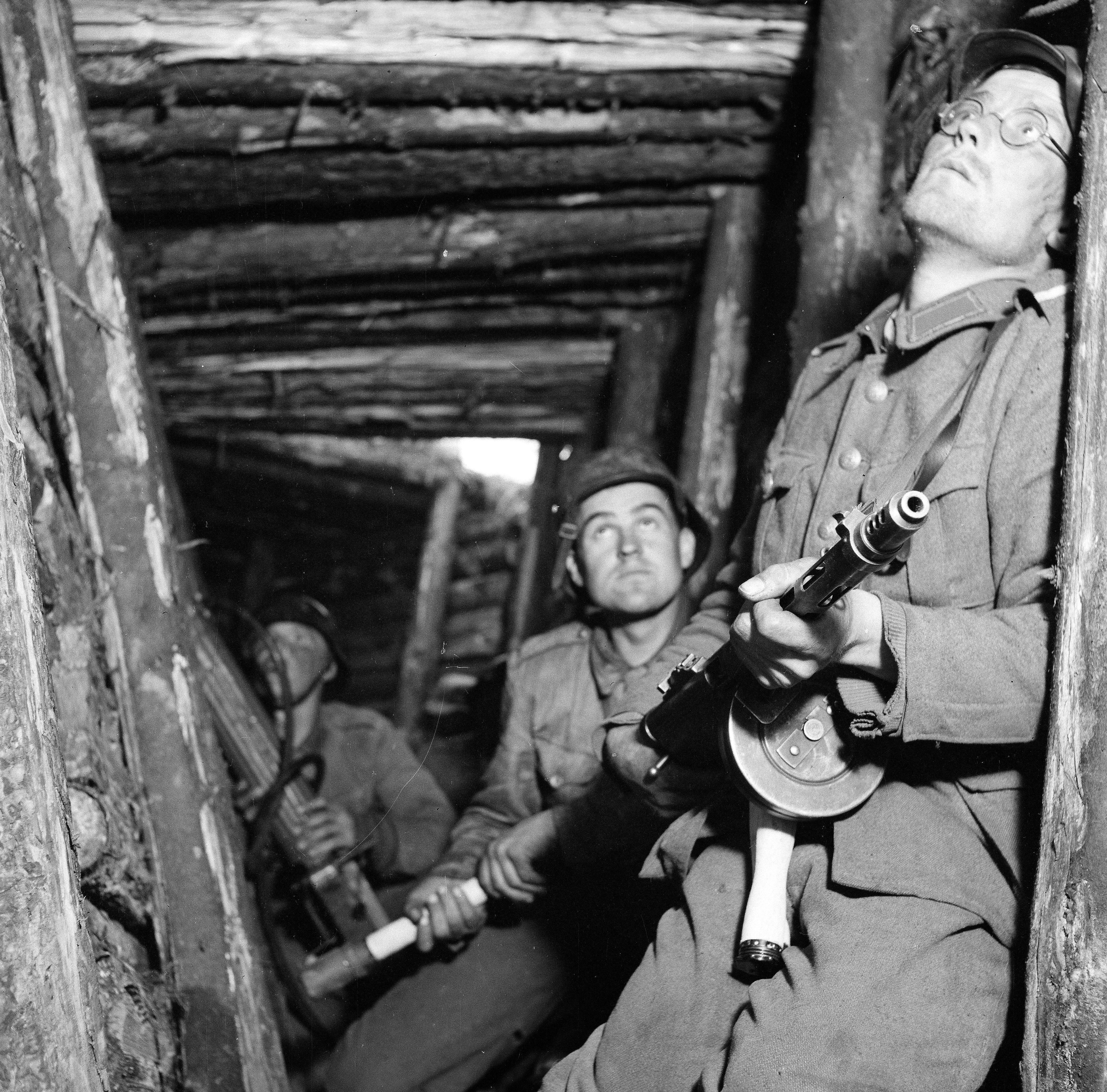
- Finnish soldiers at the VT-line of fortifications during the Soviet Vyborg–Petrozavodsk offensive in June 1944
Date	25 June 1941 – 19 September 1944 (3 years, 2 months, 3 weeks and 4 days)
Location	Finland, Karelia, and Murmansk area
Result	Soviet victory
Territorial changes	Petsamo ceded to the USSR; Porkkala Peninsula leased to the USSR for 50 years (Note: On 19 September 1955, Finland and the Soviet Union signed an agreement to return the Porkkala Peninsula to Finland. In January 1956, 12 years after its lease to the USSR, the Soviets withdrew from their naval base on Porkkala and the peninsula was returned to Finnish sovereignty.); Hanko retaken by Finland

Belligerents
Finland; Germany; Naval support: Italy (Note: Italian participation was limited to the four motor torpedo boats of the XII Squadriglia MAS serving in the international Naval Detachment K on Lake Ladoga during the summer and autumn of 1942.)	Soviet Union; Air support: United Kingdom (Note: The United Kingdom formally declared war on Finland on 6 December 1941 along with four Commonwealth states largely for appearances' sake. Before that, the British conducted a carrier raid at Petsamo on 31 July 1941, and commenced Operation Benedict to support air raids in the Murmansk area and train Soviet crews for roughly a month from September to October in 1941 (see British-Finnish War).)

Commanders and leaders
(Finland) Risto Ryti; (Finland) C.G.E. Mannerheim; (Finland) Aksel Airo; (Finland) Erik Heinrichs; (Finland) Lennart Oesch; (Nazi Germany) N. von Falkenhorst; (Nazi Germany) Eduard Dietl; (Nazi Germany) Lothar Rendulic	(Soviet Union) Joseph Stalin; (Soviet Union) Markian Popov; (Soviet Union) Valerian Frolov; (Soviet Union) Kirill Meretskov; (Soviet Union) Mikhail Khozin; (Soviet Union) Leonid Govorov

Strength
Average: 450,000 Finns; Peak: 700,000 Finns; 1941: 67,000 Germans; 1944: 214,000 Germans; 2,000 Estonian volunteers 1,000 Swedish volunteers 99 Italian navy personnel 550 aircraft	Total: 900,000–1,500,000; June 1941: 450,000; June 1944: 650,000; 1,506 tanks (Note: This number was found through addition of the strength of the two Mechanised Corps present in the Northern Front at the time of the invasion. The 1st Mechanised Corps and the 10th Mechanised Corps had 1,037 and 469 tanks respectively.); 1,382 aircraft (Note: This number was found by adding number of 700 aircraft present in the eight aviation divisions in the Soviet Air Forces in the Northern Front and the 682 aircraft in the Red Banner Baltic Fleet.)

Casualties and losses
Finnish; 63,200 dead or missing; 158,000 wounded; 2,370–3,500 captured; 182 aircraft; 225,000 total casualties; Not including civilian casualties; German; 23,200 dead or missing; 60,400 wounded; 84,000 total casualties; Not including civilian casualties	Soviet; 250,000–305,000 dead or missing; 575,000 medical casualties (including 385,000 wounded and 190,000 sick); 64,000 captured; 697 tanks; 1,600 airplanes; 890,000–944,000 total casualties; Not including civilian casualties, such as siege of Leningrad

The Continuation War, (Note: This name is translated as follows: Finnish: jatkosota, Swedish: fortsättningskriget, German: Fortsetzungskrieg. The names Finnish Front of the Great Patriotic War. (Russian: Советско-финский фронт Великой Отечественной войны) and the Soviet–Finnish War 1941–1944 (Russian: Советско–финская война 1941–1944) are often used in Russian historiography. The U.S. Library of Congress' catalogue also lists the variants War of Retribution and War of Continuation (see authority control).) also known as the Second Soviet–Finnish War, was a conflict fought by Finland and Nazi Germany against the Soviet Union during World War II. It began with a Finnish declaration of war on 25 June 1941 and ended on 19 September 1944 with the Moscow Armistice. The Soviet Union and Finland had previously fought the Winter War from 1939 to 1940, which ended with the Soviet failure to conquer Finland and the Moscow Peace Treaty. Numerous reasons have been proposed for the Finnish decision to invade, with regaining territory lost during the Winter War regarded as the most common. Other justifications for the conflict include Finnish President Risto Ryti's vision of a Greater Finland and Commander-in-Chief Carl Gustaf Emil Mannerheim's desire to annex East Karelia.

On 22 June 1941, the Axis Powers invaded the Soviet Union. Three days later, the Soviet Union conducted an air raid on Finnish cities which prompted Finland to declare war and allow German troops in Finland to begin offensive warfare. By September 1941, Finland had regained its post–Winter War concessions to the Soviet Union in Karelia. The Finnish Army continued its offensive past the 1939 border during the invasion of East Karelia and halted it only around 30–32 km (19–20 mi) from the centre of Leningrad. It participated in besieging the city by cutting the northern supply routes and by digging in until 1944. In Lapland, joint German–Finnish forces failed to capture Murmansk or cut the Kirov (Murmansk) Railway. The Soviet Vyborg–Petrozavodsk offensive in June and August 1944 drove the Finns from most of the territories that they had gained during the war, but the Finnish Army halted the offensive in August 1944.

Hostilities between Finland and the USSR ceased in September 1944 with the signing of the Moscow Armistice in which Finland restored its borders per the 1940 Moscow Peace Treaty and additionally ceded Petsamo and leased the Porkkala Peninsula to the Soviets. Furthermore, Finland was required to pay war reparations to the Soviet Union, accept partial responsibility for the war, and acknowledge that it had been a German ally. Finland was also required by the agreement to expel German troops from Finnish territory, which led to the Lapland War between Finland and Germany.

== Background ==
=== Winter War ===
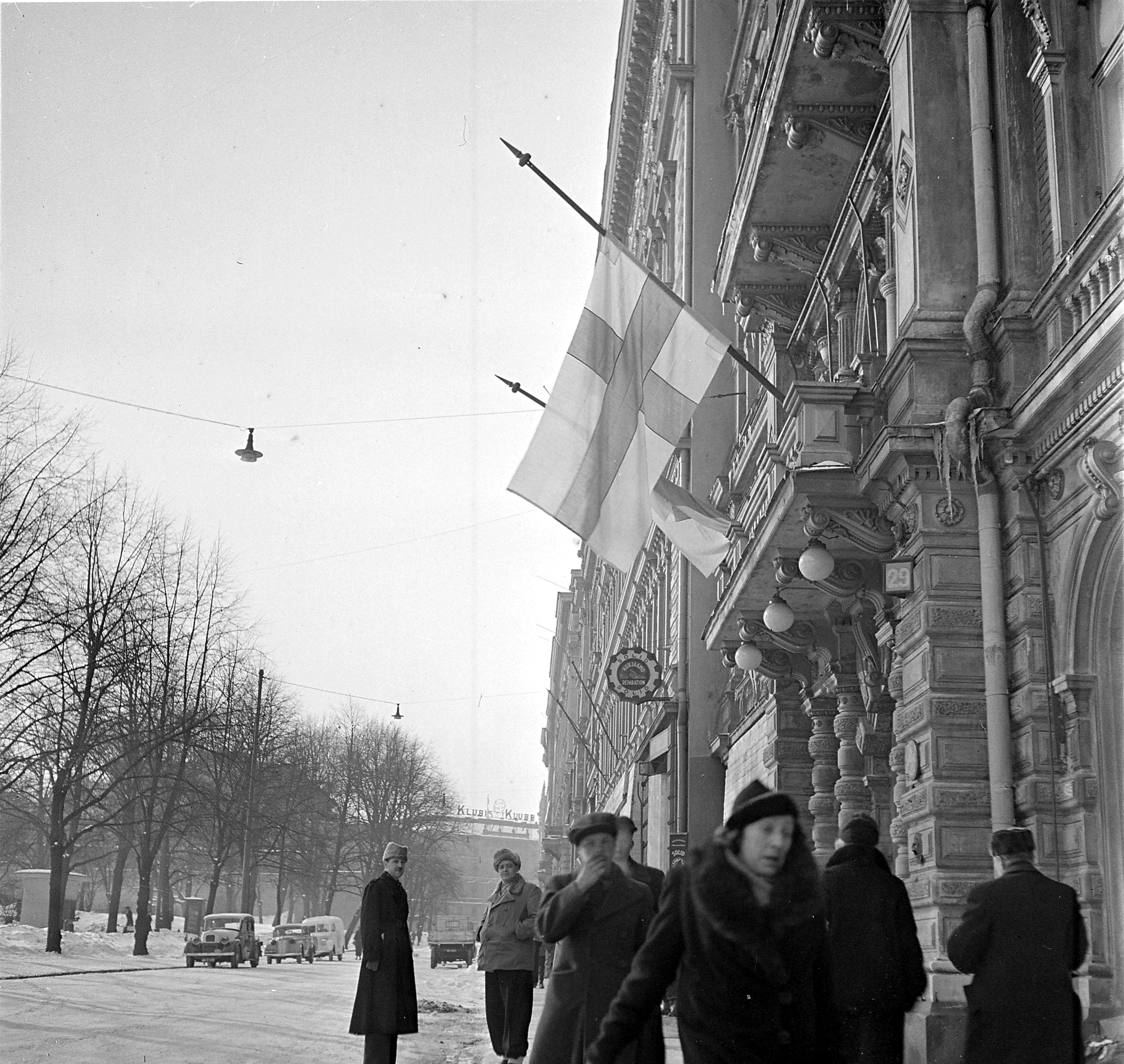
Finnish flags at half-mast in Helsinki on 13 March 1940 after the Moscow Peace Treaty became public

On 23 August 1939, the Soviet Union and Germany signed the Molotov–Ribbentrop Pact in which both parties agreed to divide the independent countries of Finland, Estonia, Latvia, Lithuania, Poland, and Romania into spheres of interest, with Finland falling within the Soviet sphere. One week later, Germany invaded Poland, leading to the United Kingdom and France declaring war on Germany, and not long after, the Soviet Union invaded eastern Poland on 17 September. The Soviet government then turned its attention to the Baltic states of Estonia, Latvia, and Lithuania, demanding that they allow Soviet military bases to be established and troops stationed on their soil. The Baltic governments acquiesced to these demands and signed agreements in September and October.

In October 1939, the Soviet Union attempted to negotiate with Finland to cede Finnish territory on the Karelian Isthmus and the islands of the Gulf of Finland, and to establish a Soviet military base near the Finnish capital of Helsinki. The Finnish government refused, and the Red Army invaded Finland on 30 November 1939. The same day, Field Marshal C. G. E. Mannerheim, who was chairman of Finland's Defence Council at the time, assumed the position of Commander-in-Chief of the Finnish Defence Forces. The USSR was expelled from the League of Nations and was condemned by the international community for the illegal attack. Foreign support for Finland was promised, but very little actual help materialised, except from Sweden. The Moscow Peace Treaty concluded the 105-day Winter War on 13 March 1940 and started the Interim Peace. By the terms of the treaty, Finland ceded 9% of its national territory and 13% of its economic capacity to the Soviet Union. Some 420,000 evacuees were resettled from the ceded territories. Finland avoided total conquest of the country by the Soviet Union and retained its sovereignty.

Prior to the war, Finnish foreign policy had been based on multilateral guarantees of support from the League of Nations and Nordic countries, but this policy was considered a failure. After the war, Finnish public opinion favored the reconquest of territory ceded to the Soviet Union. The government declared national defence to be its first priority, and military expenditure rose to nearly half of public spending. Finland both received donations and purchased war materiel during and immediately after the Winter War. Likewise, the Finnish leadership wanted to preserve the spirit of unanimity that was felt throughout the country during the Winter War. The divisive White Guard tradition of the Finnish Civil War's 16 May victory-day celebration was therefore discontinued.

The Soviet Union had received the Hanko Naval Base, on Finland's southern coast near the capital Helsinki, where it deployed over 30,000 Soviet military personnel. Relations between Finland and the Soviet Union remained strained after the signing of the one-sided peace treaty, and there were disputes regarding the implementation of the treaty. Finland sought security against further territorial depredations by the USSR and proposed mutual defence agreements with Norway and Sweden, but these initiatives were quashed by Moscow.

=== German and Soviet expansion in Europe ===
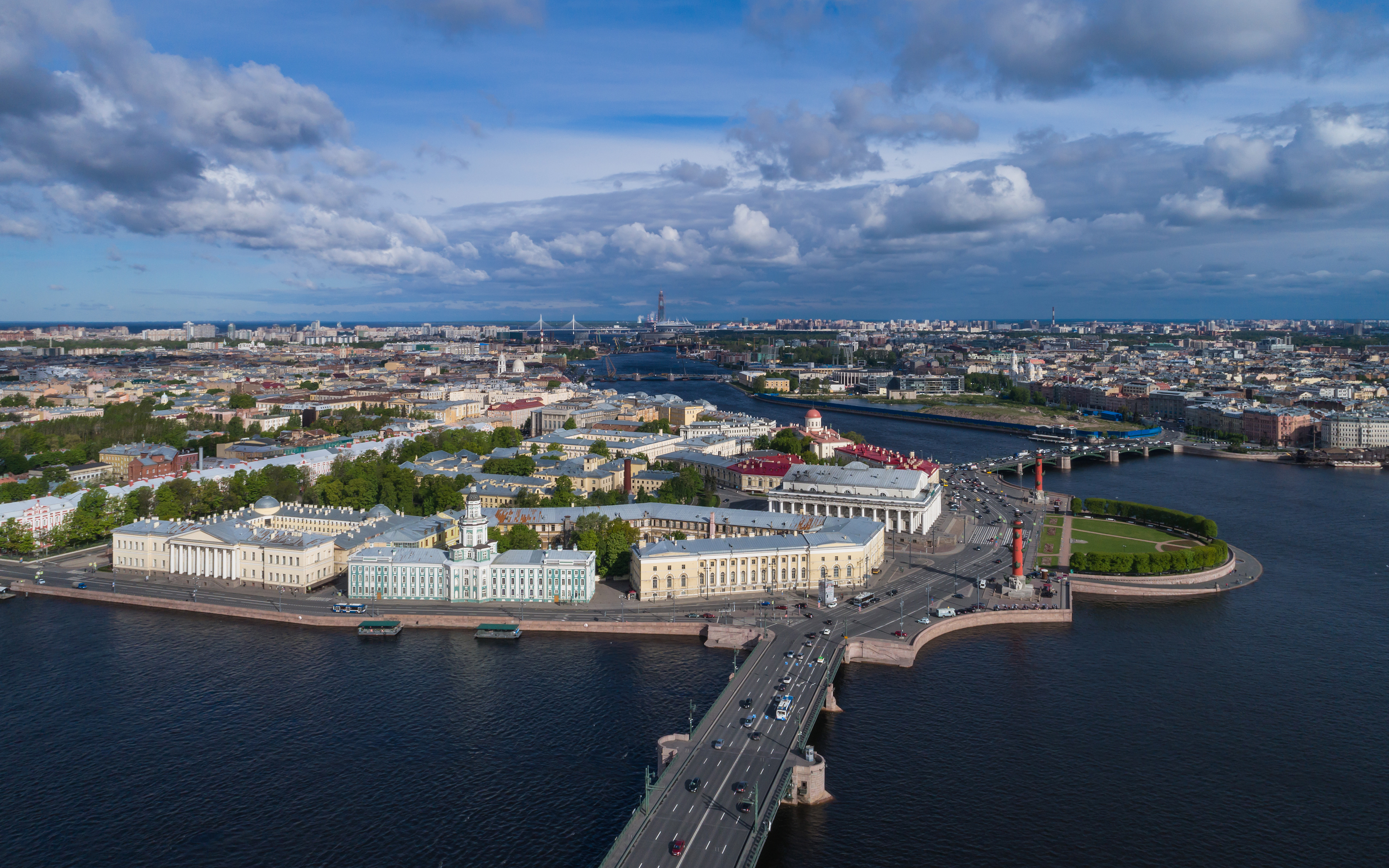
Vasilyevsky Island in Saint Petersburg, pictured in 2017. During the Winter and Continuation Wars, Leningrad, as it was then known, was of strategic importance to both sides.

After the Winter War, Germany was viewed with distrust by the Finnish, as it was considered an ally of the Soviet Union. Nonetheless, the Finnish government sought to restore diplomatic relations with Germany, but also continued its Western-orientated policy and negotiated a war trade agreement with the United Kingdom. The agreement was renounced after the German invasion of Denmark and Norway on 9 April 1940 resulted in the UK cutting all trade and traffic communications with the Nordic countries. With the fall of France, a Western orientation was no longer considered a viable option in Finnish foreign policy. On 15 and 16 June, the Soviet Union occupied the Baltic states almost without any resistance and Soviet puppet regimes were installed. Within two months Estonia, Latvia and Lithuania were incorporated into the USSR and by mid–1940, the two remaining northern democracies, Finland and Sweden, were encircled by the hostile states of Germany and the Soviet Union.

On 23 June, shortly after the Soviet occupation of the Baltic states began, Soviet Foreign Minister Vyacheslav Molotov contacted the Finnish government to demand that a mining licence be issued to the Soviet Union for the nickel mines in Petsamo or, alternatively, permission for the establishment of a joint Soviet-Finnish company to operate there. A licence to mine the deposit had already been granted to a British-Canadian company and so the demand was rejected by Finland. The following month, the Soviets demanded that Finland destroy the fortifications on the Åland Islands and to grant the Soviets the right to use Finnish railways to transport Soviet troops to the newly acquired Soviet base at Hanko. The Finns very reluctantly agreed to those demands. On 24 July, Molotov accused the Finnish government of persecuting the communist Finland–Soviet Union Peace and Friendship Society and soon afterward publicly declared support for the group. The society organised demonstrations in Finland, some of which turned into riots.

Russian-language sources from the post-Soviet era, such as the study Stalin's Missed Chance, maintain that Soviet policies leading up to the Continuation War were best explained as defensive measures by offensive means. The Soviet division of occupied Poland with Germany, the Soviet occupation of the Baltic states and the Soviet invasion of Finland during the Winter War are described as elements in the Soviet construction of a security zone or buffer region from the perceived threat from the capitalist powers of Western Europe. Other post-Soviet Russian-language sources consider establishment of Soviet satellite states in the Warsaw Pact countries and the Finno-Soviet Treaty of 1948 as the culmination of the Soviet defence plan. Western historians, such as Norman Davies and John Lukacs, dispute this view and describe pre-war Soviet policy as an attempt to stay out of the war and regain the land lost due to the Treaty of Brest-Litovsk after the fall of the Russian Empire.

=== Relations between Finland, Germany, and the Soviet Union ===
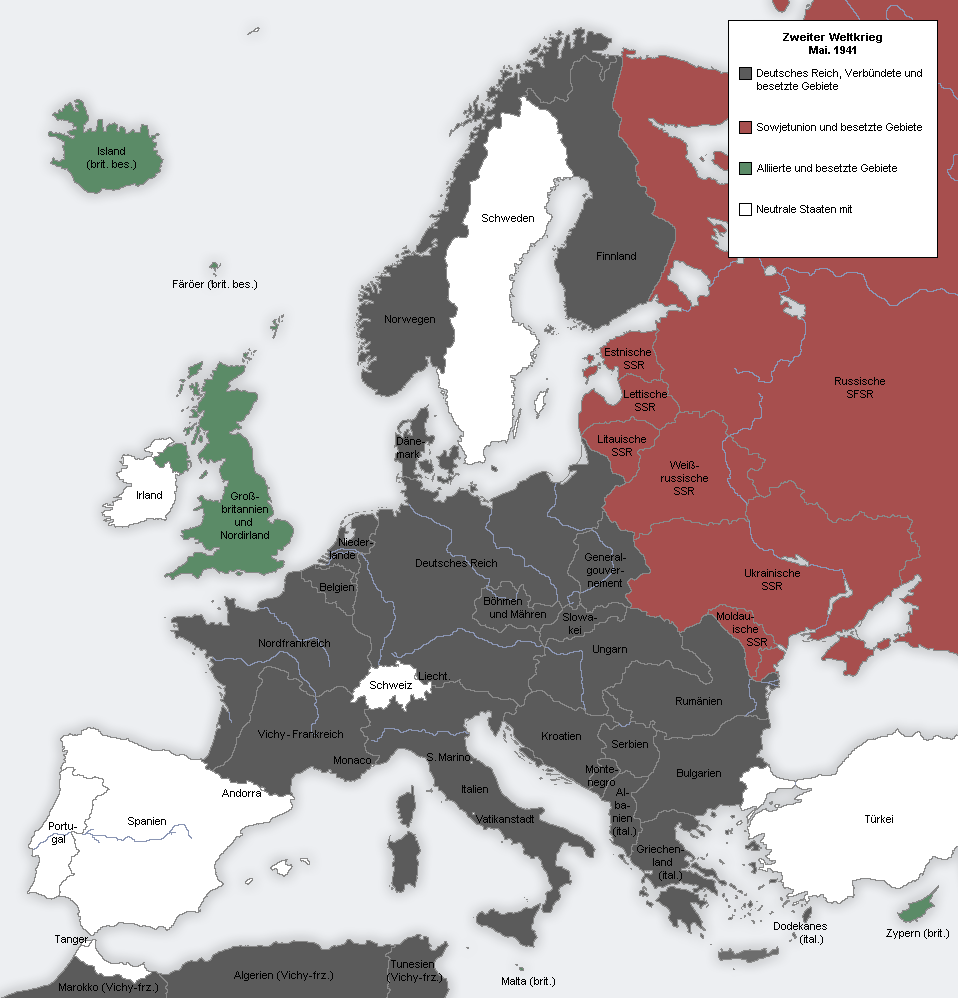
The geopolitical status in Europe in May 1941: The United Kingdom and occupied areas Germany, its allies and occupied areas The Soviet Union and occupied areas. Note how Finland is marked as a German ally.

On 31 July 1940, Adolf Hitler gave the order to plan an assault on the Soviet Union, meaning Germany had to reassess its position regarding both Finland and Romania. Until then, Germany had rejected Finnish requests to purchase arms, but with the prospect of an invasion of Russia, that policy was reversed, and in August, the secret sale of weapons to Finland was permitted. Military authorities signed an agreement on 12 September, and an official exchange of diplomatic notes was sent on 22 September. Meanwhile, German troops were allowed to transit through Sweden and Finland. This change in policy meant Germany had effectively redrawn the border of the German and Soviet spheres of influence, in violation of the Molotov–Ribbentrop Pact.

In response to that new situation, Molotov visited Berlin on 12–13 November 1940. He requested for Germany to withdraw its troops from Finland and to stop enabling Finnish anti-Soviet sentiments. He also reminded the Germans of the 1939 pact. Hitler inquired how the Soviets planned to settle the "Finnish question" to which Molotov responded that it would mirror the events in Bessarabia and the Baltic states. Hitler rejected that course of action. During the Finnish presidential election in December 1940, Risto Ryti was elected to be president largely due to interference by Molotov in Ryti's favour since he had signed the Moscow Peace Treaty as prime minister.

On 18 December 1940, Hitler officially approved Operation Barbarossa, paving the way for the German invasion of the Soviet Union, in which he expected both Finland and Romania to participate. Meanwhile, Finnish Major General Paavo Talvela met with German Colonel General Franz Halder and Reich Marshal Hermann Göring in Berlin, the first time that the Germans had advised the Finnish government, in carefully-couched diplomatic terms, that they were preparing for war with the Soviet Union. Outlines of the actual plan were revealed in January 1941 and regular contact between Finnish and German military leaders began in February. Additionally in January 1941, Moscow again demanded Finland relinquish control of the Petsamo mining area to the Soviets, but Finland, emboldened by a rebuilt defence force and German support, rejected the proposition.

In the late spring of 1941, the USSR made a number of goodwill gestures to prevent Finland from completely falling under German influence. Ambassador Ivan Stepanovich Zotov was replaced with the more conciliatory and passive Pavel Dmitrievich Orlov. Furthermore, the Soviet government announced that it no longer opposed a rapprochement between Finland and Sweden. Those conciliatory measures, however, did not have any effect on Finnish policy. Finland wished to re-enter the war mainly because of the Soviet invasion of Finland during the Winter War, which the League of Nations and Nordic neutrality had failed to prevent due to lack of outside support. Finland primarily aimed to reverse its territorial losses from the 1940 Moscow Peace Treaty and, depending on the success of the German invasion of the Soviet Union, to possibly expand its borders, especially into East Karelia. Some right-wing groups, such as the Academic Karelia Society, supported a Greater Finland ideology. This ideology of a Greater Finland mostly composed of Soviet territories was augmented by anti-Russian sentiments.

=== German and Finnish war plans ===
The details of the Finnish preparations for war are still somewhat opaque. Historian William R. Trotter stated that "it has so far proven impossible to pinpoint the exact date on which Finland was taken into confidence about Operation Barbarossa" and that "neither the Finns nor the Germans were entirely candid with one another as to their national aims and methods. In any case, the step from contingency planning to actual operations, when it came, was little more than a formality".

The inner circle of Finnish leadership, led by Ryti and Mannerheim, actively planned joint operations with Germany under a veil of ambiguous neutrality and without formal agreements after an alliance with Sweden had proved fruitless, according to a meta-analysis by Finnish historian Olli-Pekka Vehviläinen. He likewise refuted the so-called "driftwood theory" that Finland had been merely a piece of driftwood that was swept uncontrollably in the rapids of great power politics. Even then, most historians conclude that Finland had no realistic alternative to co-operating with Germany. On 20 May, the Germans invited a number of Finnish officers to discuss the coordination of Operation Barbarossa. The participants met on 25–28 May in Salzburg and Berlin and continued their meeting in Helsinki from 3 to 6 June. They agreed upon Finnish mobilisation and a general division of operations. They also agreed that the Finnish Army would start mobilisation on 15 June, but the Germans did not reveal the actual date of the assault. The Finnish decisions were made by the inner circle of political and military leaders, without the knowledge of the rest of the government. Due to tensions between Germany and the Soviet Union, the government was not informed until 9 June that mobilisation of reservists would be required.

=== Finland's relationship with Germany ===
Finland never signed the Tripartite Pact. The Finnish leadership stated they would fight against the Soviets only to the extent needed to redress the balance of the 1940 treaty, though some historians consider that it had wider territorial goals under the slogan "shorter borders, longer peace" (Finnish: "lyhyet rajat, pitkä rauha"). During the war, the Finnish leadership generally referred to the Germans as "brothers-in-arms" but also denied that they were allies of Germany – instead claiming to be "co-belligerents". For Hitler, the distinction was irrelevant since he saw Finland as an ally. The 1947 Paris Peace Treaty signed by Finland described Finland as having been "an ally of Hitlerite Germany" during the Continuation War. In a 2008 poll of 28 Finnish historians carried out by Helsingin Sanomat, 16 said that Finland had been an ally of Nazi Germany, six said it had not been and six did not take a position.

== Order of battle and operational planning ==
=== Soviet ===
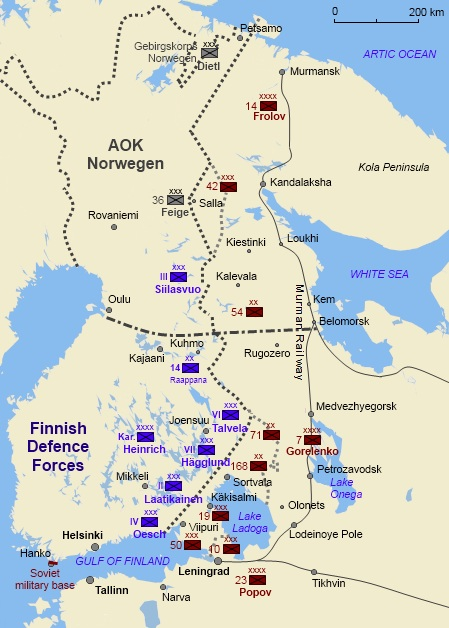
Finnish, German, and Soviet military formations at the start of the Continuation War in June and July 1941

The Northern Front (Russian: Северный фронт) of the Leningrad Military District was commanded by Lieutenant General Markian Popov and numbered around 450,000 soldiers in 18 divisions and 40 independent battalions in the Finnish region. During the Interim Peace, the Soviet Military had relaid operational plans to conquer Finland, but with the German attack, Operation Barbarossa, begun on 22 June 1941, the Soviets required its best units and latest materiel to be deployed against the Germans and so abandoned plans for a renewed offensive against Finland.

The 23rd Army was deployed in the Karelian Isthmus, the 7th Army to Ladoga Karelia and the 14th Army to the Murmansk–Salla area of Lapland. The Northern Front also commanded eight aviation divisions. As the initial German strike against the Soviet Air Forces had not affected air units located near Finland, the Soviets could deploy around 700 aircraft supported by a number of Soviet Navy wings. The Red Banner Baltic Fleet, which outnumbered the navy of Germany (Kriegsmarine), comprised 2 battleships, 2 light cruisers, 47 destroyers or large torpedo boats, 75 submarines, over 200 smaller crafts, and 682 aircraft (of which 595 were operational).

=== Finnish and German ===
The Finnish Army (Finnish: Maavoimat) mobilised between 475,000 and 500,000 soldiers in 14 divisions and 3 brigades for the invasion, commanded by Field Marshal (sotamarsalkka) Mannerheim. The army was organised as follows:

- II Corps and IV Corps: deployed to the Karelian Isthmus and comprised seven infantry divisions and one brigade.
- Army of Karelia: deployed north of Lake Ladoga and commanded by General Erik Heinrichs. It comprised the VI Corps, VII Corps, and Group Oinonen; a total of seven divisions, including the German 163rd Infantry Division, and three brigades.
- 14th Division: deployed in the Kainuu region, commanded directly by Finnish Headquarters (Päämaja).

Although initially deployed for a static defence, the Finnish Army was to later launch an attack to the south, on both sides of Lake Ladoga, putting pressure on Leningrad and thus supporting the advance of the German Army Group North through the Baltic states towards Leningrad. Finnish intelligence had overestimated the strength of the Red Army, when in fact it was numerically inferior to Finnish forces at various points along the border. The army, especially its artillery, was stronger than it had been during the Winter War but included only one armoured battalion and had a general lack of motorised transportation; the army possessed 1,829 artillery pieces at the beginning of the invasion. The Finnish Air Force (Ilmavoimat) had received large donations from Germany prior to the Continuation War including Curtiss Hawk 75s, Fokker D.XXIs, Dornier Do 22 flying boats, Morane M.S. 406 bombers, and Focke-Wulf Fw 44 Stieglitz trainers; in total the Finnish Air Force had 550 aircraft by June 1941, approximately half being combat. By September 1944, despite considerable German supply of aircraft, the Finns only had 384 planes. Even with the increase in supplied aircraft, the air force was constantly outnumbered by the Soviets.

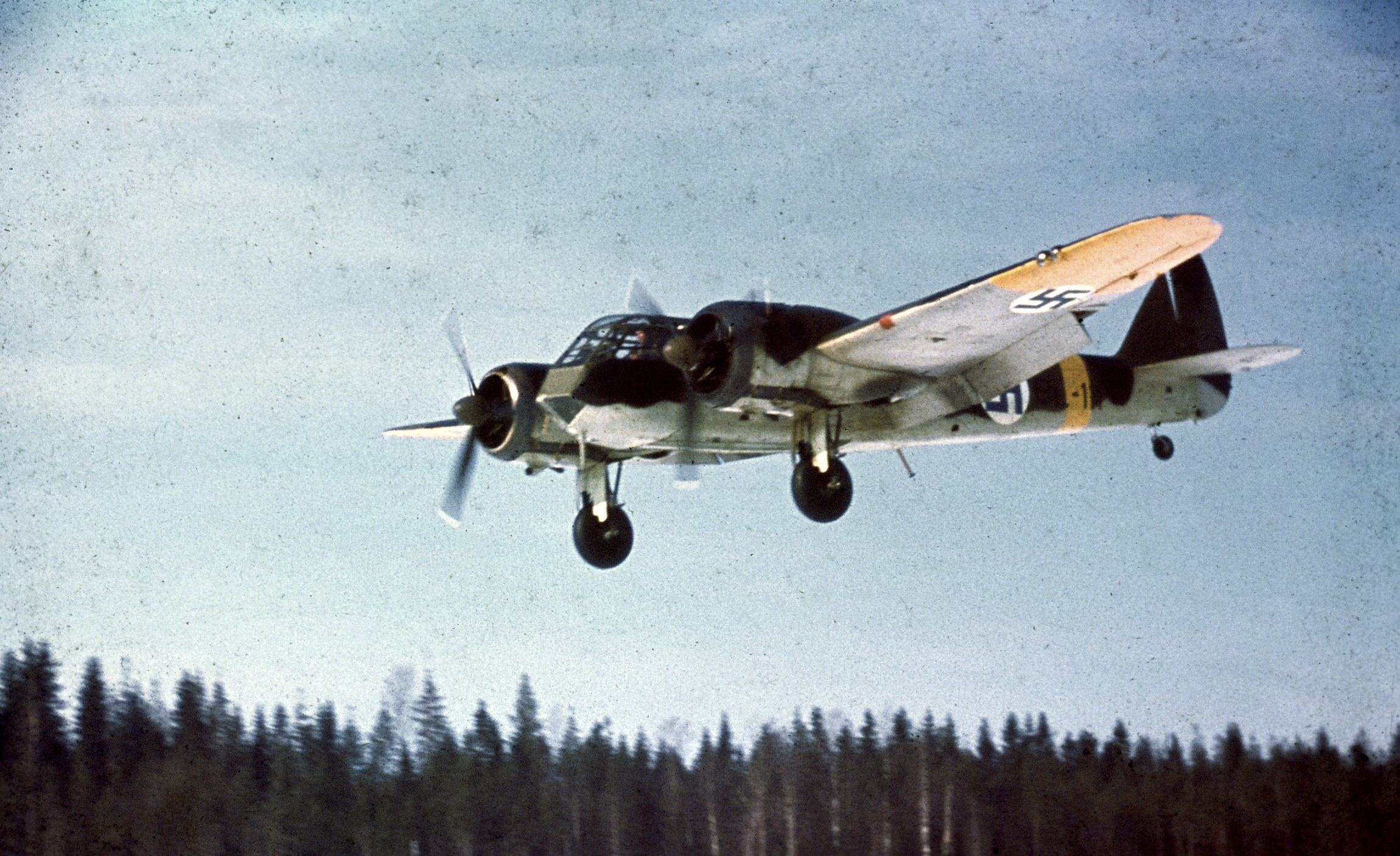
A landing Bristol Blenheim bomber-aircraft belonging to the Finnish Air Force in March 1944.

The Army of Norway, or AOK Norwegen, comprising four divisions totaling 67,000 German soldiers, held the arctic front, which stretched approximately 500 km (310 mi) through Finnish Lapland. This army would also be tasked with striking Murmansk and the Kirov (Murmansk) Railway during Operation Silver Fox. The Army of Norway was under the direct command of the German Army High Command (OKH) and was organised into Mountain Corps Norway and XXXVI Mountain Corps with the Finnish III Corps and 14th Division attached to it. The German Air Force High Command (OKL) assigned 60 aircraft from Luftflotte 5 (Air Fleet 5) to provide air support to the Army of Norway and the Finnish Army, in addition to its main responsibility of defending Norwegian air space. In contrast to the front in Finland, a total of 149 divisions and 3,050,000 soldiers were deployed for the rest of Operation Barbarossa.

== Finnish offensive phase in 1941 ==
=== Initial operations ===
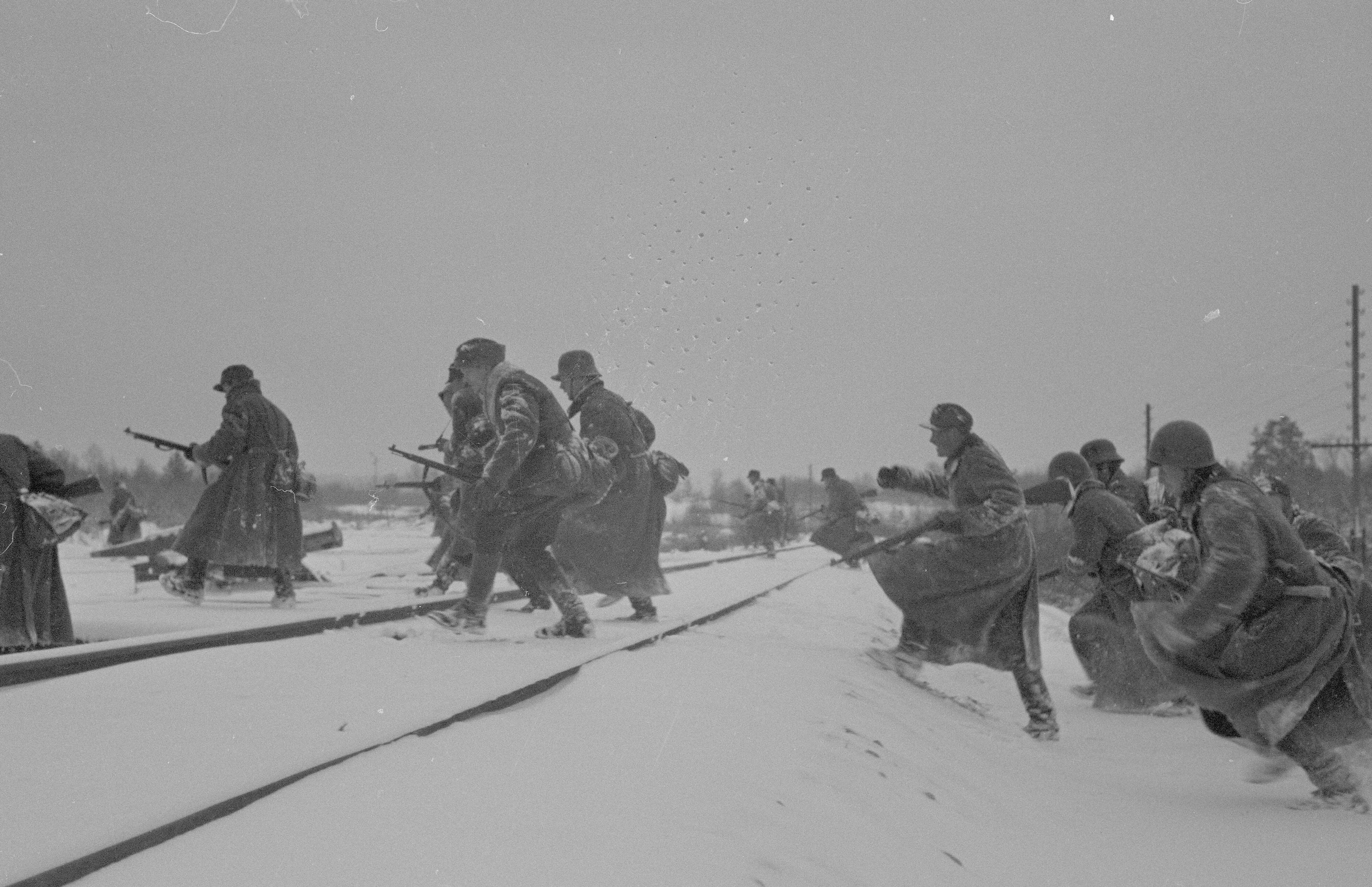
Finnish soldiers crossing the Murmansk railway in 1941.

In the evening of 21 June 1941, German mine-layers hiding in the Archipelago Sea deployed two large minefields across the Gulf of Finland. Later that night, German bombers flew along the gulf to Leningrad, mining the harbour and the river Neva, making a refueling stop at Utti, Finland, on the return leg. In the early hours of 22 June, Finnish forces launched Operation Kilpapurjehdus ("Regatta"), deploying troops in the demilitarised Åland Islands. Although the 1921 Åland convention had clauses allowing Finland to defend the islands in the event of an attack, the coordination of this operation with the German invasion and the arrest of the Soviet consulate staff stationed on the islands meant that the deployment was a deliberate violation of the treaty, according to Finnish historian Mauno Jokipii.

On the morning of 22 June, Hitler's proclamation read: "Together with their Finnish comrades in arms the heroes from Narvik stand at the edge of the Arctic Ocean. German troops under command of the conqueror of Norway, and the Finnish freedom fighters under their Marshal's command, are protecting Finnish territory."

Following the launch of Operation Barbarossa at around 3:15 a.m. on 22 June 1941, the Soviet Union sent seven bombers on a retaliatory airstrike into Finland, hitting targets at 6:06 a.m. Helsinki time as reported by the Finnish coastal defence ship Väinämöinen. At 7:15 (Moscow time) the People's Commissar of Defense of the USSR sent a directive to the Soviet armed forces, with orders "Do not carry out raids against Finland and Romania until special instructions."

On the morning of 25 June, the Soviet Union launched another air offensive, with 460 fighters and bombers targeting 19 airfields in Finland; however, inaccurate intelligence and poor bombing accuracy resulted in several raids hitting Finnish cities, or municipalities, causing considerable damage. A total of 23 Soviet bombers were lost in this strike while the Finnish forces lost no aircraft. Although the USSR claimed that the airstrikes were directed against German targets, particularly airfields in Finland, the Finnish Parliament used the attacks as justification for the approval of a "defensive war". According to historian David Kirby, the message was intended more for public opinion in Finland than abroad, where the country was viewed as an ally of the Axis powers.

=== Finnish advance in Karelia ===
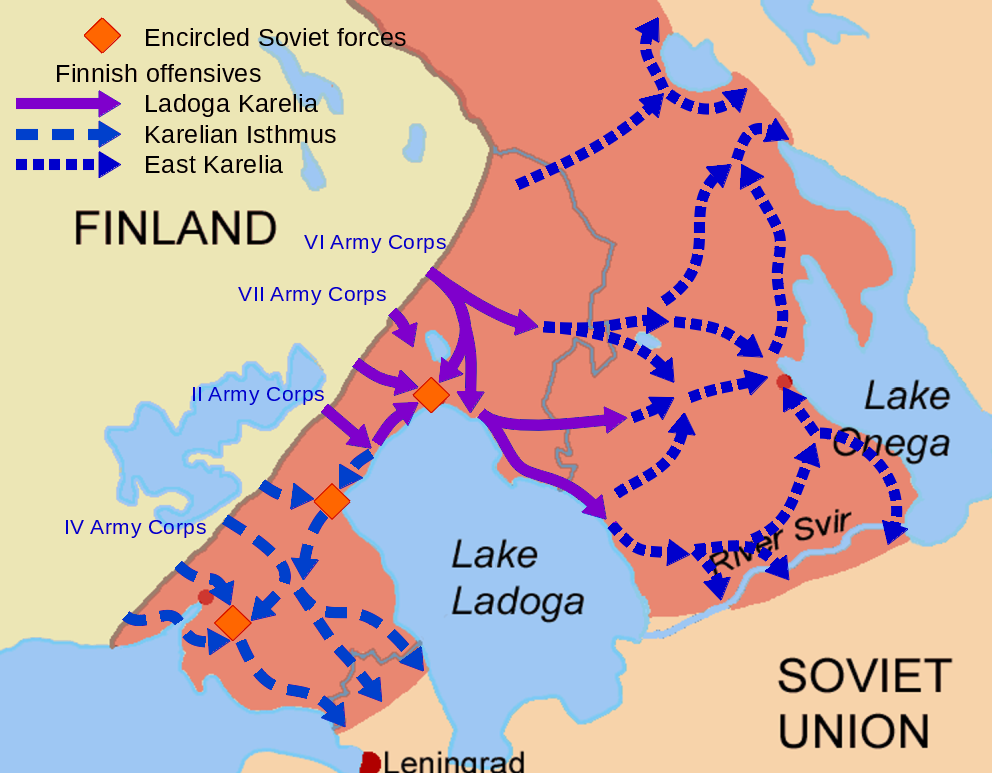
Subphases of the Finnish invasion of Karelia during the 1941 general offensive. The old 1939 border is marked in grey.

The Finnish plans for the offensive in Ladoga Karelia were finalised on 28 June 1941, and the first stages of the operation began on 10 July. By 16 July, the VI Corps had reached the northern shore of Lake Ladoga, dividing the Soviet 7th Army, which had been tasked with defending the area. The USSR struggled to contain the German assault, and soon the Soviet high command, Stavka (Russian: Ставка), pulled all available units stationed along the Finnish border into the beleaguered front line. Additional reinforcements were drawn from the 237th Rifle Division and the Soviet 10th Mechanised Corps, excluding the 198th Motorised Division, both of which were stationed in Ladoga Karelia, but this stripped much of the reserve strength of the Soviet units defending that area.

The Finnish II Corps started its offensive in the north of the Karelian Isthmus on 31 July. Other Finnish forces reached the shores of Lake Ladoga on 9 August, encircling most of the three defending Soviet divisions on the northwestern coast of the lake in a pocket (Finnish: motti); these divisions were later evacuated across the lake. On 22 August, the Finnish IV Corps began its offensive south of II Corps and advanced towards Vyborg (Finnish: Viipuri). By 23 August, II Corps had reached the Vuoksi River to the east and encircled the Soviet forces defending Vyborg. Finnish forces captured Vyborg on 29 August.

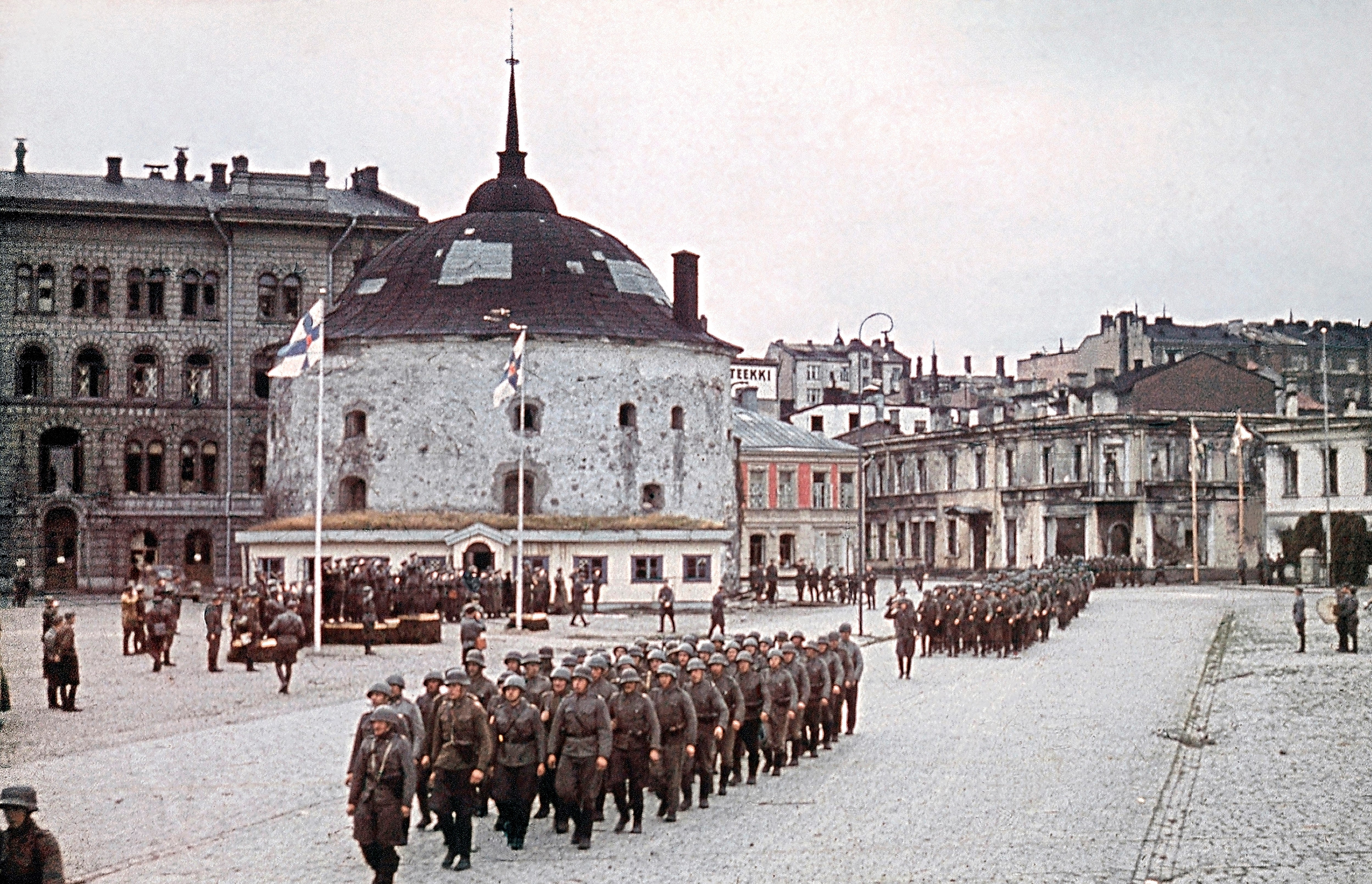
A Finnish military parade next to the Round Tower in Viipuri (now Vyborg, Russia) on 31 August 1941, celebrating its recapture.

The Soviet order to withdraw from Vyborg came too late, resulting in significant losses in materiel, although most of the troops were later evacuated via the Koivisto Islands. After suffering severe losses, the Soviet 23rd Army was unable to halt the offensive, and by 2 September the Finnish Army had reached the old 1939 border. The advance by Finnish and German forces split the Soviet Northern Front into the Leningrad Front and the Karelian Front on 23 August. On 31 August, Finnish Headquarters ordered II and IV Corps, which had advanced the furthest, to halt their advance along a line that ran from the Gulf of Finland via Beloostrov–Sestra–Okhta–Lembolovo to Lake Ladoga. The line ran past the former 1939 border, and approximately 30–32 km (19–20 mi) from Leningrad; a defensive position was established along this line. On 30 August, the IV Corps fought the Soviet 23rd Army in the Battle of Porlampi and defeated them on 1 September. Sporadic fighting continued around Beloostrov until the Soviets evicted the Finns on 5 September. The front on the Isthmus stabilised and the siege of Leningrad began on 8 September.

The Finnish Army of Karelia started its attack in East Karelia towards Petrozavodsk, Lake Onega and the Svir River on 9 September. German Army Group North advanced from the south of Leningrad towards the Svir River and captured Tikhvin but were forced to retreat to the Volkhov River by Soviet counterattacks. Soviet forces repeatedly attempted to expel the Finns from their bridgehead south of the Svir during October and December but were repulsed; Soviet units attacked the German 163rd Infantry Division in October 1941, which was operating under Finnish command across the Svir, but failed to dislodge it. Despite these failed attacks, the Finnish attack in East Karelia had been blunted and their advance had halted by 6 December. During the five-month campaign, the Finns suffered 75,000 casualties, of whom 26,355 had died, while the Soviets had 230,000 casualties, of whom 50,000 became prisoners of war.

=== Operation Silver Fox in Lapland and Lend-Lease to Murmansk ===
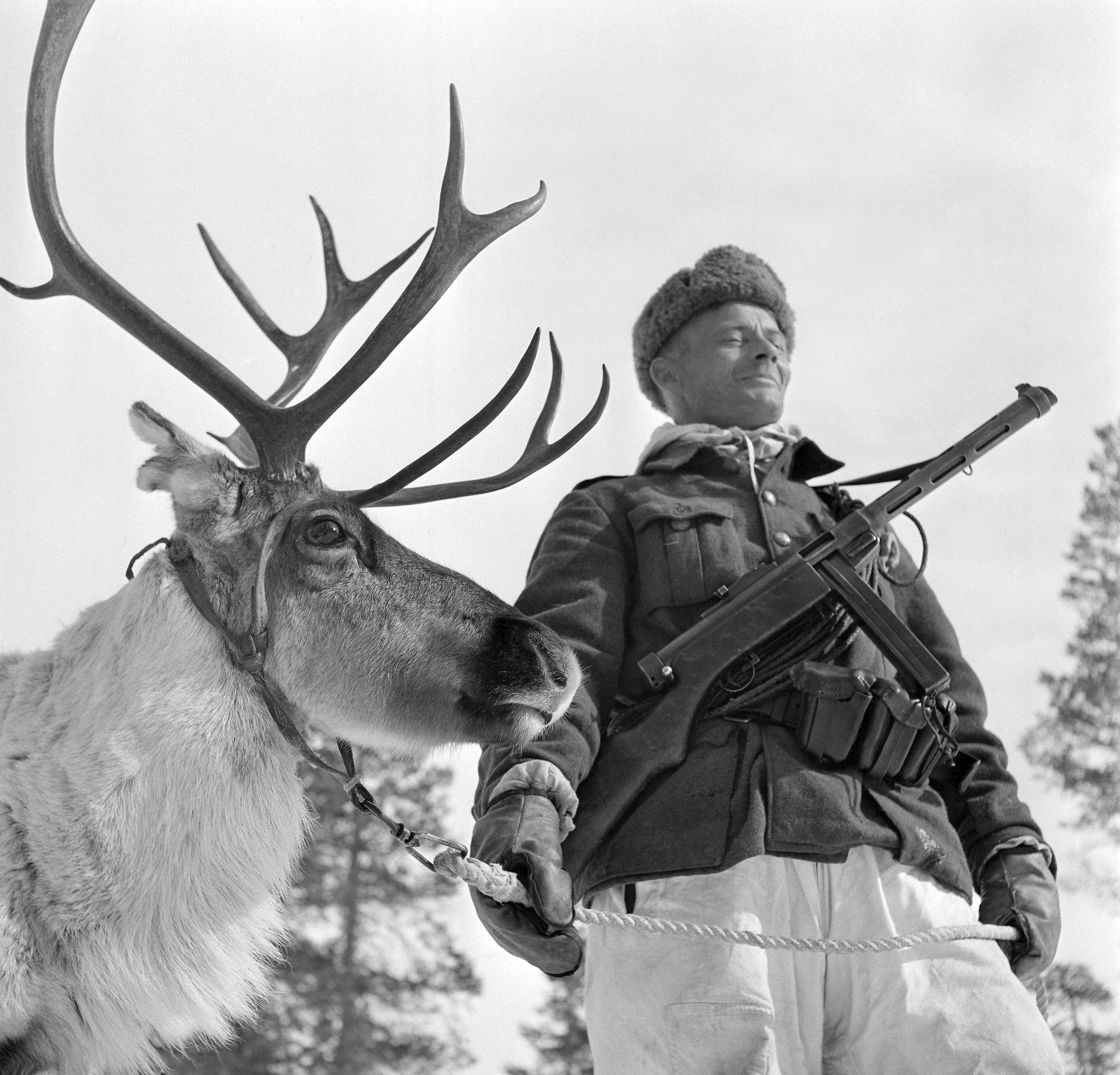
Finnish Sámi soldier Rájá-Jovnna with a reindeer in Lapland. Reindeer were used in many capacities, such as pulling supply sleighs in snowy conditions.

The German objective in Finnish Lapland was to take Murmansk and cut the Kirov (Murmansk) Railway running from Murmansk to Leningrad by capturing Salla and Kandalaksha. Murmansk was the only year-round ice-free port in the north and a threat to the nickel mine at Petsamo. The joint Finnish–German Operation Silver Fox (German: Unternehmen Silberfuchs; Finnish: operaatio Hopeakettu) was started on 29 June 1941 by the German Army of Norway, which had the Finnish 3rd and 6th Divisions under its command, against the defending Soviet 14th Army and 54th Rifle Division. By November, the operation had stalled 30 km (19 mi) from the Kirov Railway due to unacclimatised German troops, heavy Soviet resistance, poor terrain, arctic weather and diplomatic pressure by the United States on the Finns regarding the lend-lease deliveries to Murmansk. The offensive and its three sub-operations failed to achieve their objectives. Both sides dug in and the arctic theatre remained stable, excluding minor skirmishes, until the Soviet Petsamo–Kirkenes Offensive in October 1944.

The crucial arctic lend-lease convoys from the US and the UK via Murmansk and Kirov Railway to the bulk of the Soviet forces continued throughout World War II. The US supplied almost $11 billion in materials: 400,000 jeeps and trucks; 12,000 armored vehicles (including 7,000 tanks, which could equip some 20 US armoured divisions); 11,400 aircraft; and 1.59 million t (1.75 million short tons) of food. As a similar example, British shipments of Matilda, Valentine and Tetrarch tanks accounted for only 6% of total Soviet tank production, but over 25% of medium and heavy tanks produced for the Red Army.

=== Aspirations, war effort and international relations ===
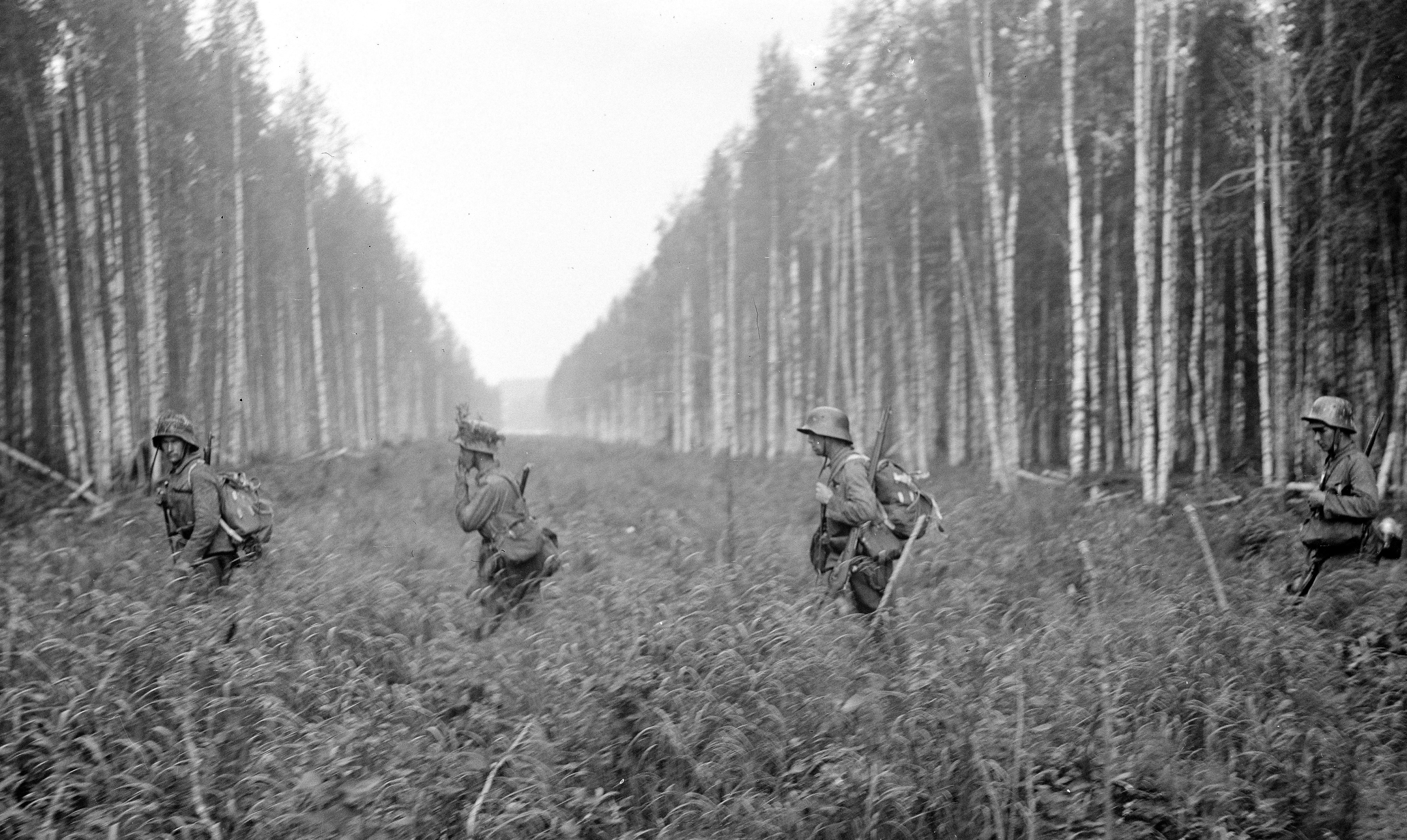
Finnish soldiers crossing the 1940-agreed border (Moscow Peace Treaty) at Tohmajärvi on 12 July 1941, two days after the invasion started.

The Wehrmacht rapidly advanced deep into Soviet territory early in the Operation Barbarossa campaign, leading the Finnish government to believe that Germany would defeat the Soviet Union quickly. President Ryti envisioned a Greater Finland, where Finns and other Finnic peoples would live inside a "natural defence borderline" by incorporating the Kola Peninsula, East Karelia and perhaps even northern Ingria. In public, the proposed frontier was introduced with the slogan "short border, long peace". Some members of the Finnish Parliament, such as members of the Social Democratic Party and the Swedish People's Party, opposed the idea, arguing that maintaining the 1939 frontier would be enough. Mannerheim often called the war an anti-Communist crusade, hoping to defeat "Bolshevism once and for all". On 10 July, Mannerheim drafted his order of the day, the Sword Scabbard Declaration, in which he pledged to liberate Karelia; in December 1941 in private letters, he made known his doubts of the need to push beyond the previous borders. The Finnish government assured the United States that it was unaware of the order.

According to Vehviläinen, most Finns thought that the scope of the new offensive was only to regain what had been taken in the Winter War. He further stated that the term 'Continuation War' was created at the start of the conflict by the Finnish government to justify the invasion to the population as a continuation of the defensive Winter War. The government also wished to emphasise that it was not an official ally of Germany, but a 'co-belligerent' fighting against a common enemy and with purely Finnish aims. Vehviläinen wrote that the authenticity of the government's claim changed when the Finnish Army crossed the old frontier of 1939 and began to annex Soviet territory. British author Jonathan Clements asserted that by December 1941, Finnish soldiers had started questioning whether they were fighting a war of national defence or foreign conquest.

By the autumn of 1941, the Finnish military leadership started to doubt Germany's capability to finish the war quickly. The Finnish Defence Forces suffered relatively severe losses during their advance and, overall, German victory became uncertain as German troops were halted near Moscow. German troops in northern Finland faced circumstances they were unprepared for and failed to reach their targets. As the front lines stabilised, Finland attempted to start peace negotiations with the USSR. Mannerheim refused to assault Leningrad, which would inextricably tie Finland to Germany; he regarded his objectives for the war to be achieved, a decision that angered the Germans.

Due to the war effort, the Finnish economy suffered from a lack of labour, as well as food shortages and increased prices. To combat this, the Finnish government demobilised part of the army to prevent industrial and agricultural production from collapsing. In October, Finland informed Germany that it would need 159,000 t (175,000 short tons) of grain to manage until next year's harvest. The German authorities would have rejected the request, but Hitler himself agreed. Annual grain deliveries of 180,000 t (200,000 short tons) equaled almost half of the Finnish domestic crop. On 25 November 1941, Finland signed the Anti-Comintern Pact, a less formal alliance, which the German leadership saw as a "litmus test of loyalty".

Finland maintained good relations with a number of other Western powers. Foreign volunteers from Sweden and Estonia were among the foreigners who joined Finnish ranks. Infantry Regiment 200, called soomepoisid ("Finnish boys"), mostly Estonians, and the Swedes mustered the Swedish Volunteer Battalion. The Finnish government stressed that Finland was fighting as a co-belligerent with Germany against the USSR only to protect itself and that it was still the same democratic country as it had been in the Winter War. For example, Finland maintained diplomatic relations with the Norwegian government in exile and more than once criticised German occupation policy in Norway.

Relations between Finland and the United States were more complex since the American public was sympathetic to the "brave little democracy" and had anticommunist sentiments. At first, the United States sympathised with the Finnish cause, but the situation became problematic after the Finnish Army had crossed the 1939 border. Finnish and German troops were a threat to the Kirov Railway and the northern supply line between the Western Allies and the Soviet Union. On 25 October 1941, the US demanded that Finland cease all hostilities against the USSR and withdraw behind the 1939 border. In public, President Ryti rejected the demands, but in private, he wrote to Mannerheim on 5 November and asked him to halt the offensive. Mannerheim agreed and secretly instructed General Hjalmar Siilasvuo and his III Corps to end the assault on the Kirov Railway. Nevertheless, the United States never declared war on Finland during the entire conflict.

=== British declaration of war and action in the Arctic Ocean ===
On 12 July 1941, the United Kingdom signed an agreement of joint action with the Soviet Union. Under German pressure, Finland closed the British legation in Helsinki and cut diplomatic relations with Britain on 1 August. On 2 August 1941, Britain declared that Finland was under enemy occupation, which ended all economic transactions between Britain and Finland and led to a blockade of Finnish trade. The most sizable British action on Finnish soil was the Raid on Kirkenes and Petsamo, an aircraft-carrier strike on German and Finnish ships on 31 July 1941. The attack accomplished little except the loss of one Norwegian ship and three British aircraft, but it was intended to demonstrate British support for its Soviet ally. From September to October in 1941, a total of 39 Hawker Hurricanes of No. 151 Wing RAF, based at Murmansk, reinforced and provided pilot-training to the Soviet Air Forces during Operation Benedict to protect arctic convoys. On 28 November, the British government presented Finland with an ultimatum demanding for the Finns to cease military operations by 3 December. Unofficially, Finland informed the Allies that Finnish troops would halt their advance in the next few days. The reply did not satisfy London, which declared war on Finland on 6 December. (Note: Secondary sources contradict each other and state either 5 or 6 December as the day war was declared. According to a news piece on 8 December 1941 by The Examiner, an Australian newspaper, Britain notified the Finnish Government on 6 December "that she considered herself at war with [Finland] as from 1 a.m. (G.M.T.) to-morrow.") The Commonwealth nations of Canada, Australia, India and New Zealand soon followed suit. In private, British Prime Minister Winston Churchill had sent a letter to Mannerheim on 29 November in which Churchill was "deeply grieved" that the British would have to declare war on Finland because of the British alliance with the Soviets. Mannerheim repatriated British volunteers under his command to the United Kingdom via Sweden. According to Clements, the declaration of war was mostly for appearance's sake.

== Trench warfare from 1942 to 1944 ==
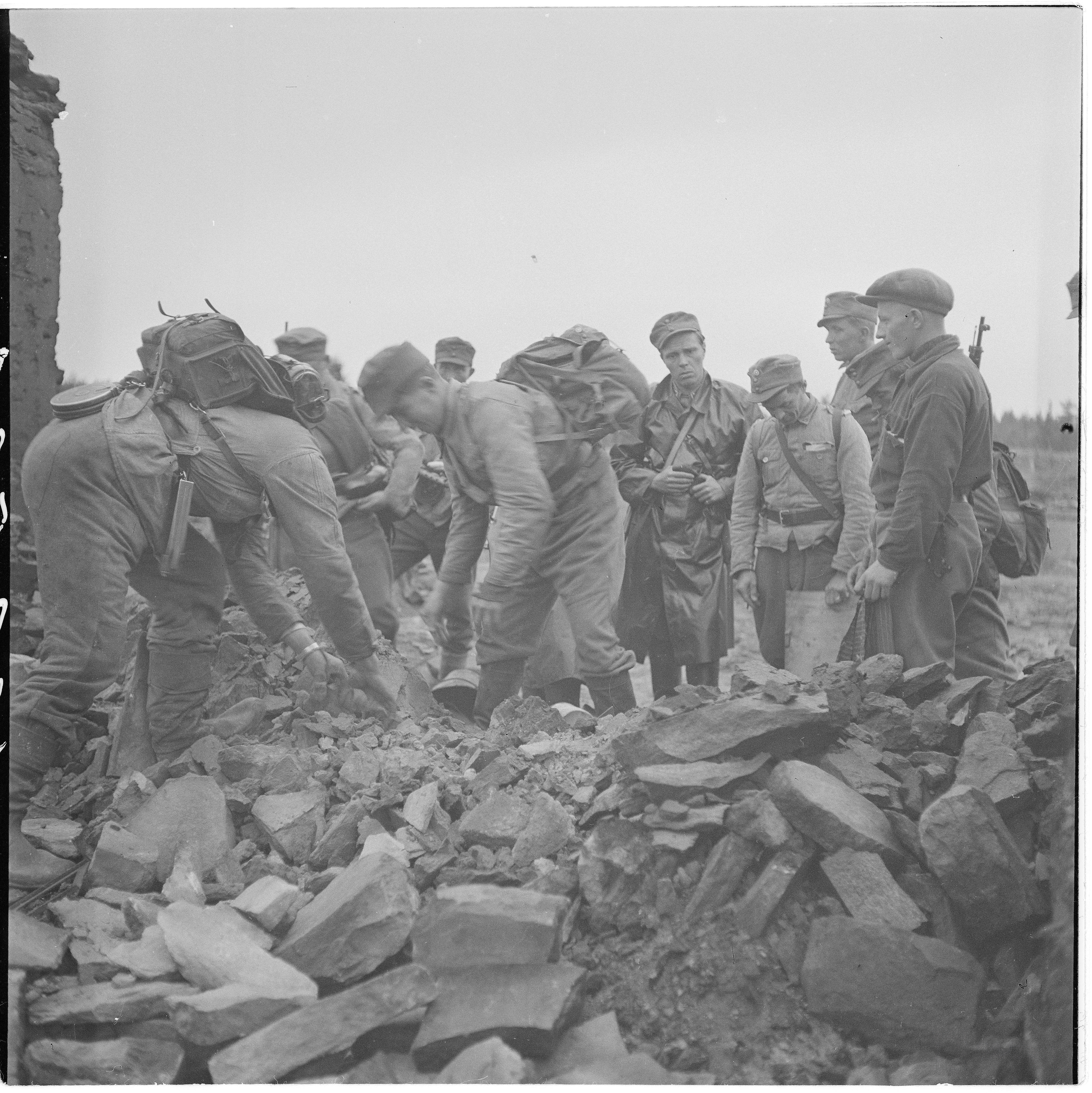
Finnish soldiers searching for remains of victims at a burned-down house after a Soviet partisan attack on the village of Viianki, in Suomussalmi. The burnt bodies of over ten civilians, including women and children, were found.

=== Unconventional warfare and military operations ===
Unconventional warfare was fought in both the Finnish and Soviet wildernesses. Finnish long-range reconnaissance patrols, organised both by the Intelligence Division's Detached Battalion 4 and by local units, patrolled behind Soviet lines. Soviet partisans, both resistance fighters and regular long-range patrol detachments, conducted a number of operations in Finland and in Eastern Karelia from 1941 to 1944. In summer 1942, the USSR formed the 1st Partisan Brigade. The unit was 'partisan' in name only, as it was essentially 600 men and women on long-range patrol intended to disrupt Finnish operations. The 1st Partisan Brigade was able to infiltrate beyond Finnish patrol lines, but was intercepted, and rendered ineffective, in August 1942 at Lake Segozero. Irregular partisans distributed propaganda newspapers, such as Finnish translations of the official Communist Party paper Pravda (Russian: Правда). Notable Soviet politician Yuri Andropov took part in these partisan guerrilla actions. Finnish sources state that, although Soviet partisan activity in East Karelia disrupted Finnish military supply and communication assets, almost two thirds of the attacks targeted civilians, killing 200 and injuring 50, including children and elderly.

Between 1942 and 1943, military operations were limited, although the front did see some action. In January 1942, the Soviet Karelian Front attempted to retake Medvezhyegorsk (Finnish: Karhumäki), which had been lost to the Finns in late 1941. With the arrival of spring in April, Soviet forces went on the offensive on the Svir River front, in the Kestenga (Finnish: Kiestinki) region further north in Lapland as well as in the far north at Petsamo with the 14th Rifle Division's amphibious landings supported by the Northern Fleet. All Soviet offensives started promisingly, but due either to the Soviets overextending their lines or stubborn defensive resistance, the offensives were repulsed. After Finnish and German counterattacks in Kestenga, the front lines were generally stalemated. In September 1942, the USSR attacked again at Medvezhyegorsk, but despite five days of fighting, the Soviets only managed to push the Finnish lines back 500 m (550 yd) on a roughly 1 km (0.62 mi) long stretch of the front. Later that month, a Soviet landing with two battalions in Petsamo was defeated by a German counterattack. In November 1941, Hitler decided to separate the German forces fighting in Lapland from the Army of Norway and create the Army of Lapland, commanded by Colonel General Eduard Dietl. In June 1942, the Army of Lapland was redesignated the 20th Mountain Army.

=== Siege of Leningrad and naval warfare ===
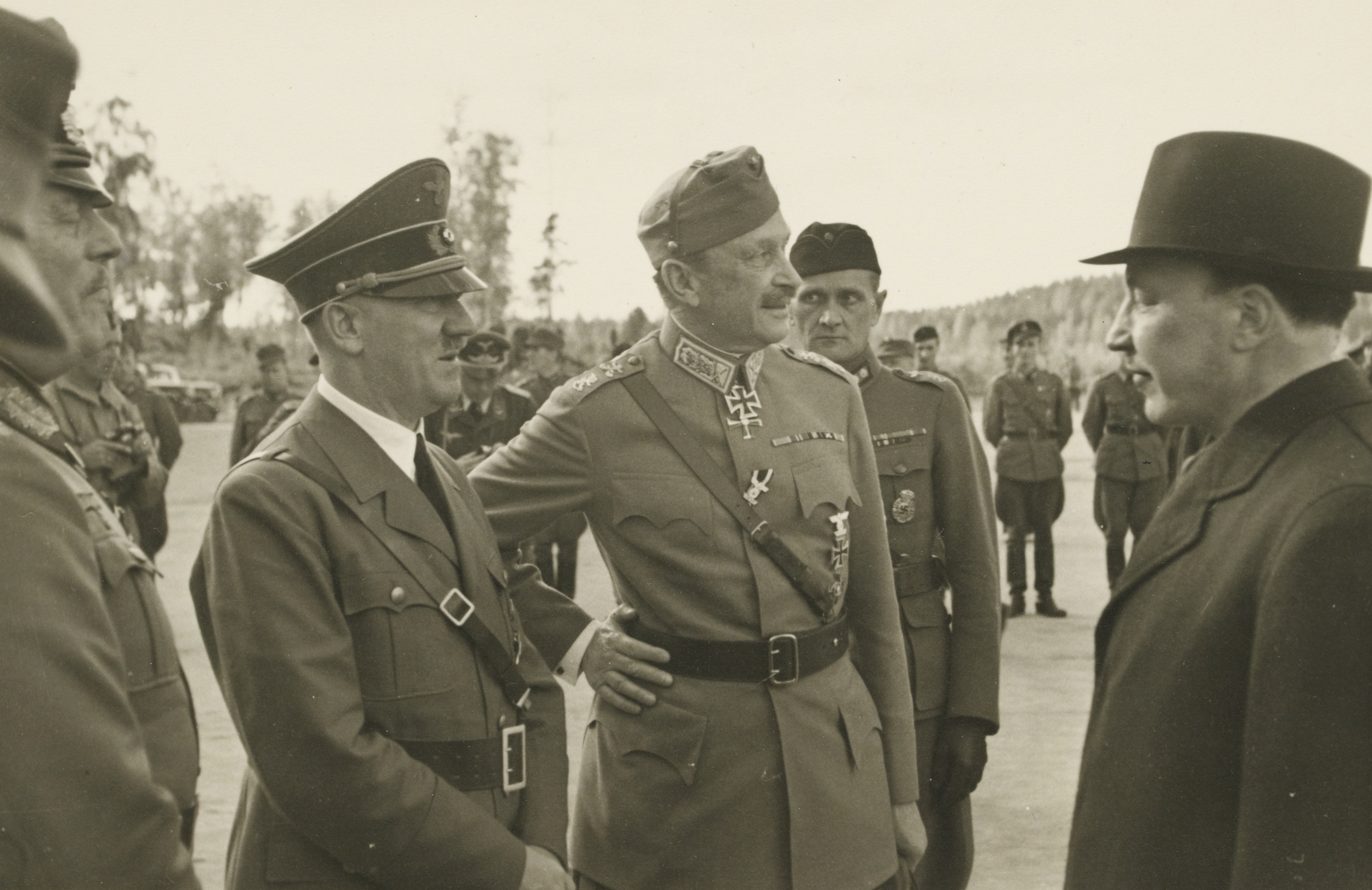
Keitel (left), Hitler, Mannerheim and Ryti meeting at Immola Airfield on 4 June 1942. Hitler made a surprise visit in honour of Mannerheim's 75th birthday and to discuss plans.

In the early stages of the war, the Finnish Army overran the former 1939 border, but ceased their advance 30–32 km (19–20 mi) from the center of Leningrad. Multiple authors have stated that Finland participated in the siege of Leningrad (Russian: Блокада Ленинграда), but the full extent and nature of their participation is debated and a clear consensus has yet to emerge. American historian David Glantz writes that the Finnish Army generally maintained their lines and contributed little to the siege from 1941 to 1944, whereas Russian historian Nikolai Baryshnikov stated in 2002 that Finland tacitly supported Hitler's starvation policy for the city. However, in 2009 British historian Michael Jones disputed Baryshnikov's claim and asserted that the Finnish Army cut off the city's northern supply routes but did not take further military action. In 2006, American author Lisa Kirschenbaum wrote that the siege started "when German and Finnish troops severed all land routes in and out of Leningrad."

According to Clements, Mannerheim personally refused Hitler's request of assaulting Leningrad during their meeting on 4 June 1942. Mannerheim explained to Hitler that "Finland had every reason to wish to stay out of any further provocation of the Soviet Union." In 2014, author Jeff Rutherford described the city as being "ensnared" between the German and Finnish armies. British historian John Barber described it as a "siege by the German and Finnish armies from 8 September 1941 to 27 January 1944 [...]" in his foreword in 2017. Likewise, in 2017, Alexis Peri wrote that the city was "completely cut off, save a heavily patrolled water passage over Lake Ladoga" by "Hitler's Army Group North and his Finnish allies."

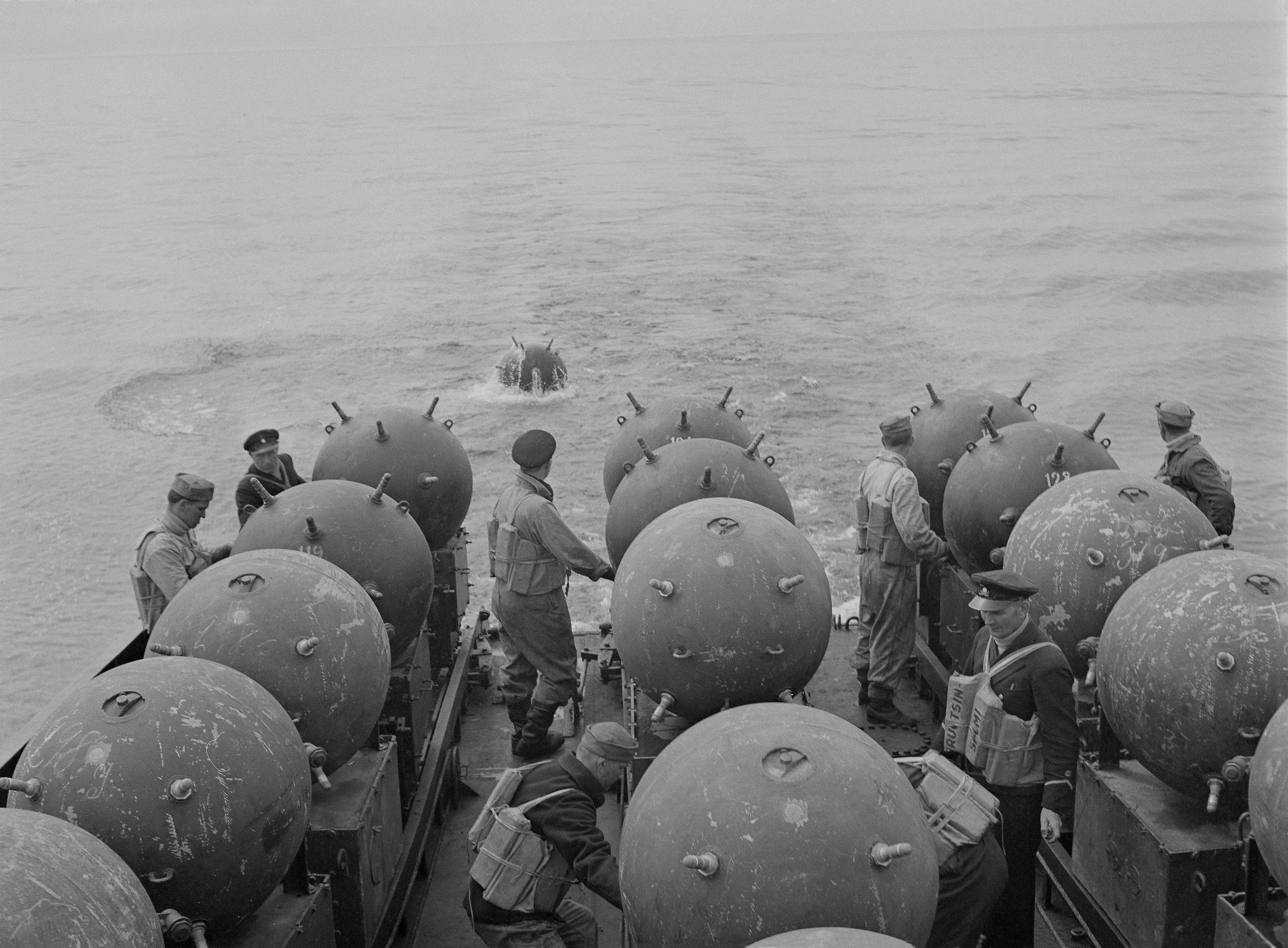
The Finnish minelayer Ruotsinsalmi lays naval mines in the Gulf of Finland in May 1942

The 150 speedboats, two minelayers and four steamships of the Finnish Ladoga Naval Detachment, as well as numerous shore batteries, had been stationed on Lake Ladoga since August 1941. Finnish Lieutenant General Paavo Talvela proposed on 17 May 1942 to create a joint Finnish–German–Italian unit on the lake to disrupt Soviet supply convoys to Leningrad. The unit was named Naval Detachment K and comprised four Italian MAS torpedo motorboats of the XII Squadriglia MAS, four German KM-type minelayers and the Finnish torpedo-motorboat Sisu. The detachment began operations in August 1942 and sank numerous smaller Soviet watercraft and flatboats and assaulted enemy bases and beach fronts until it was dissolved in the winter of 1942–43. Twenty-three Siebel ferries and nine infantry transports of the German Einsatzstab Fähre Ost were also deployed to Lake Ladoga and unsuccessfully assaulted the island of Sukho, which protected the main supply route to Leningrad, in October 1942.

Despite the siege of the city, the Soviet Baltic Fleet was still able to operate from Leningrad. The Finnish Navy's flagship Ilmarinen had been sunk in September 1941 in the gulf by mines during the failed diversionary Operation North Wind in 1941. In early 1942, Soviet forces recaptured the island of Gogland, but lost it and the Bolshoy Tyuters islands to Finnish forces later in spring 1942. During the winter between 1941 and 1942, the Soviet Baltic Fleet decided to use their large submarine fleet in offensive operations. Though initial submarine operations in the summer of 1942 were successful, the Kriegsmarine and Finnish Navy soon intensified their anti-submarine efforts, making Soviet submarine operations later in 1942 costly. The underwater offensive carried out by the Soviets convinced the Germans to lay anti-submarine nets as well as supporting minefields between Porkkala Peninsula and Naissaar, which proved to be an insurmountable obstacle for Soviet submarines. On the Arctic Ocean, Finnish radio intelligence intercepted Allied messages on supply convoys to Murmansk, such as PQ 17 and PQ 18, and relayed the information to the Abwehr, German intelligence.

=== Finnish military administration and concentration camps ===
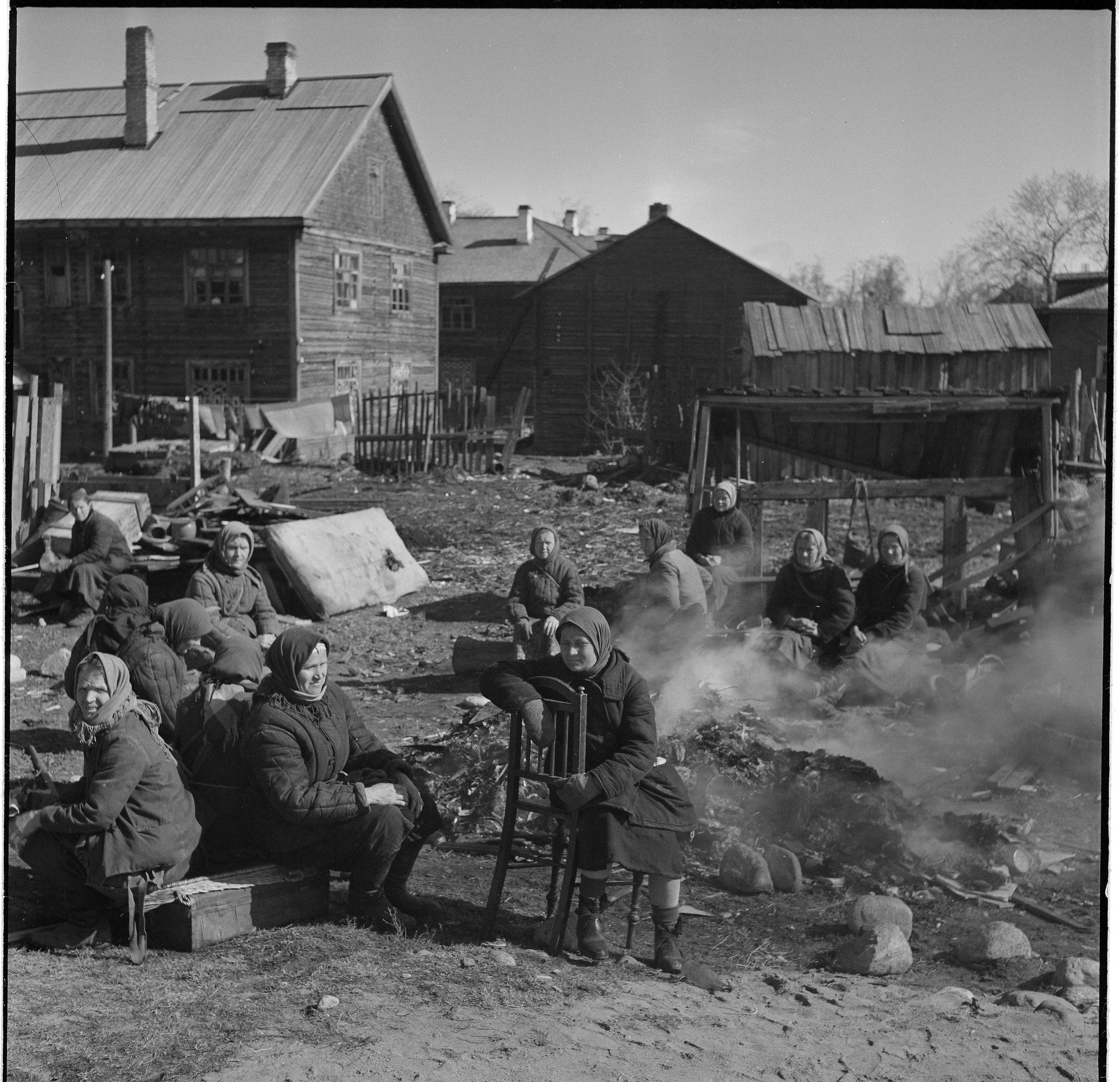
Soviet women having breakfast next to burning trash at a Finnish concentration camp in Petrozavodsk.

On 19 July 1941, the Finns created a military administration in occupied East Karelia with the goal of preparing the region for eventual incorporation into Finland. The Finns aimed to expel the Russian portion of the local population (constituting to about a half), who were deemed "non-national", from the area once the war was over, and replace them with Finno-Ugric peoples. Most of the East Karelian population had already been evacuated before the Finnish forces arrived, but about 85,000 people — mostly elderly, women and children — were left behind, less than half of whom were Karelians. A significant number of civilians, almost 30% of the remaining Russians, were interned in concentration camps.

The winter between 1941 and 1942 was particularly harsh for the Finnish urban population due to poor harvests and a shortage of agricultural labourers. However, conditions were much worse for Russians in Finnish concentration camps. More than 3,500 people died, mostly from starvation, amounting to 13.8% of those detained, while the corresponding figure for the free population of the occupied territories was 2.6%, and 1.4% for Finland. Conditions gradually improved, ethnic discrimination in wage levels and food rations was terminated, and new schools were established for the Russian-speaking population the following year, after Commander-in-Chief Mannerheim called for the International Committee of the Red Cross from Geneva to inspect the camps. By the end of the occupation, mortality rates had dropped to the same levels as in Finland.

=== Jews in Finland ===
In 1939, Finland had a small Jewish population of approximately 2,000 people, of whom 300 were refugees from Germany, Austria, and Czechoslovakia. They had full civil rights and fought with other Finns in the ranks of the Finnish Army. The field synagogue in East Karelia was one of the very few functioning synagogues on the Axis side during the war. There were several cases of Jewish officers of the Finnish Army being awarded the German Iron Cross, which they declined. German soldiers were treated by Jewish medical officers—who sometimes saved the soldiers' lives. German command mentioned Finnish Jews at the Wannsee Conference in January 1942, wishing to transport them to the Majdanek concentration camp in occupied Poland. SS leader Heinrich Himmler also raised the topic of Finnish Jews during his visit in Finland in the summer of 1942; Finnish Prime Minister Jukka Rangell replied that Finland did not have a Jewish question. In November 1942, the Minister of the Interior Toivo Horelli and the head of State Police Arno Anthoni secretly deported eight Jewish refugees to the Gestapo, raising protests among Finnish Social Democrat Party ministers. Only one of the deportees survived. After the incident, the Finnish government refused to transfer any more Jews to German detainment.

== Soviet offensive in 1944 ==
=== Air raids and the Leningrad–Novgorod Offensive ===
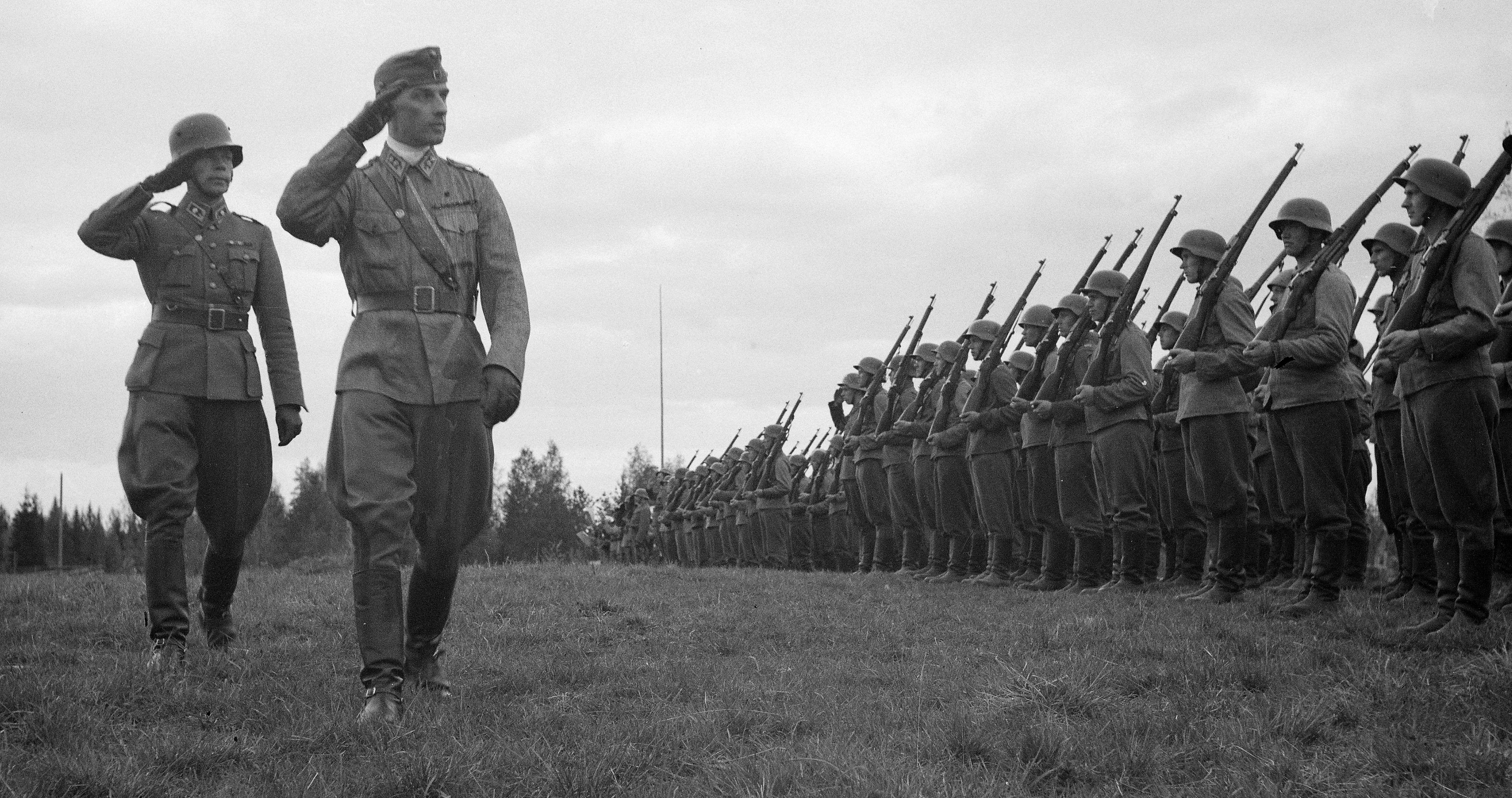
Adolf Ehrnrooth inspecting troops only a few days before the Soviet mass offensive in the summer of 1944.

Finland began to seek an exit from the war after the German defeat at the Battle of Stalingrad in February 1943. Finnish Prime Minister Edwin Linkomies formed a new cabinet in March 1943 with peace as the top priority. Similarly, the Finns were distressed by the Allied invasion of Sicily in July and the German defeat in the Battle of Kursk in August. Negotiations were conducted intermittently in 1943 and 1944 between Finland, the Western Allies and the Soviets, but no agreement was reached. Stalin decided to force Finland to surrender with a bombing campaign on Helsinki. Starting in February 1944, it included three major air attacks totaling over 6,000 sorties. Finnish anti-aircraft defence repelled the raids, and only 5% of the dropped bombs hit their planned targets. In Helsinki, decoy searchlights and fires were placed outside the city to deceive Soviet bombers into dropping their payloads on unpopulated areas. Major air attacks also hit Oulu and Kotka, but pre-emptive radio intelligence and effective defence kept the number of casualties low.

The Soviet Leningrad–Novgorod Offensive finally lifted the siege of Leningrad on 27 January 1944. The Army Group North was pushed to Ida-Viru County on the Estonian border. Stiff German and Estonian defence in Narva from February to August prevented the use of occupied Estonia as a favourable base for Soviet amphibious and air assaults against Helsinki and other Finnish coastal cities in support of a land offensive. Field Marshal Mannerheim had reminded the German command on numerous occasions that if the German troops withdrew from Estonia, Finland would be forced to make peace, even on extremely unfavourable terms. Finland abandoned peace negotiations in April 1944 because of the unfavourable terms the USSR demanded.

=== Vyborg–Petrozavodsk Offensive and breakthrough ===
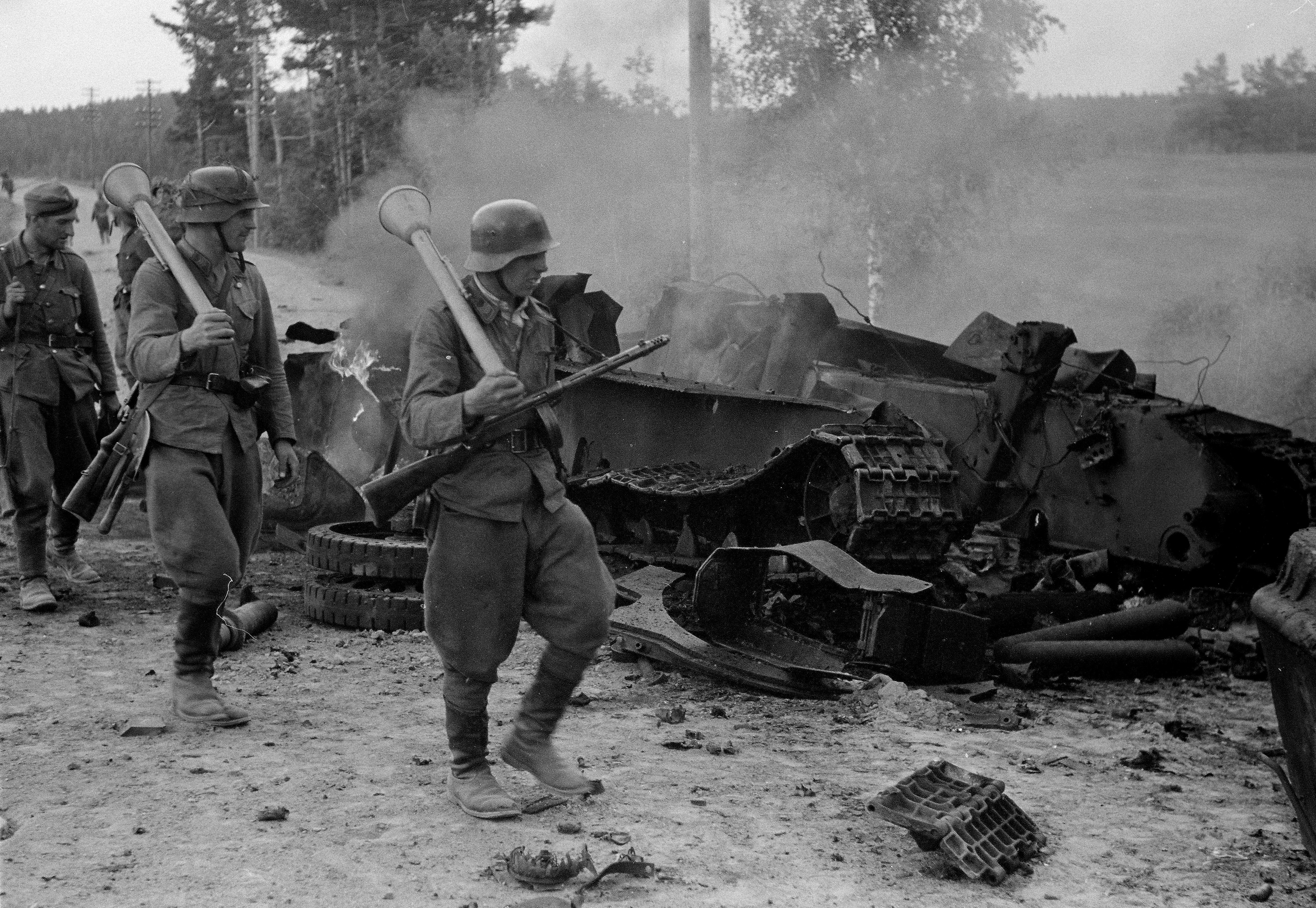
Finnish soldiers carrying Panzerfäuste on their shoulders pass by the remains of a destroyed Soviet T-34 tank at the Battle of Tali-Ihantala

On 9 June 1944, the Soviet Leningrad Front launched an offensive against Finnish positions on the Karelian Isthmus and in the area of Lake Ladoga, timed to coincide with Operation Overlord in Normandy as agreed during the Tehran Conference. Along the 21.7 km (13.5 mi)-wide breakthrough, the Red Army concentrated 3,000 guns and mortars. In some places, the concentration of artillery pieces exceeded 200 guns for every kilometre of front or one for every 5 m (5.5 yd). Soviet artillery fired over 80,000 rounds along the front on the Karelian Isthmus. On the second day of the offensive, the artillery barrages and superior number of Soviet forces crushed the main Finnish defence line. The Red Army penetrated the second line of defence, the Vammelsuu–Taipale line (VT line), at Kuuterselkä by the sixth day and recaptured Viipuri with insignificant resistance on 20 June. The Soviet breakthrough on the Karelian Isthmus forced the Finns to reinforce the area, thus allowing the concurrent Soviet offensive in East Karelia to meet less resistance and to recapture Petrozavodsk by 28 June 1944.

On 25 June, the Red Army reached the third line of defence, the Viipuri–Kuparsaari–Taipale line (VKT line), and the decisive Battle of Tali-Ihantala began, which has been described as the largest battle in Nordic military history. By then, the Finnish Army had retreated around 100 km (62 mi) to approximately the same line of defence they had held at the end of the Winter War. Finland especially lacked modern anti-tank weaponry that could stop Soviet heavy armour, such as the KV-1 or IS-2. Thus, German Foreign Minister Joachim von Ribbentrop offered German hand-held Panzerfaust and Panzerschreck antitank weapons in exchange for a guarantee that Finland would not seek a separate peace with the Soviets. On 26 June, President Risto Ryti gave the guarantee as a personal undertaking that he, Field Marshal Mannerheim and Prime Minister Edwin Linkomies intended to last legally only for the remainder of Ryti's presidency. In addition to delivering thousands of anti-tank weapons, Hitler sent the 122nd Infantry Division and the half-strength 303rd Assault Gun Brigade armed with Sturmgeschütz III tank destroyers as well as the Luftwaffe's Detachment Kuhlmey to provide temporary support in the most vulnerable sectors. With the new supplies and assistance from Germany, the Finnish Army halted the numerically and materially superior Soviet advance at Tali-Ihantala on 9 July 1944 and stabilised the front.

More battles were fought toward the end of the war, culminating with a Finnish victory in the Battle of Ilomantsi and the destruction of two Soviet divisions. Resisting the Soviet offensive had exhausted Finnish resources. Despite German support under the Ryti–Ribbentrop Agreement, Finland asserted that it would be unable to blunt another major offensive. Soviet victories against German Army Groups Center and North during Operation Bagration made the situation even more dire for Finland. With no imminent further Soviet offensives, Finland sought to leave the war. On 1 August, Ryti resigned, and on 4 August, Field Marshal Mannerheim was sworn in as the new president. He annulled the agreement between Ryti and Ribbentrop on 17 August to allow Finland to sue for peace with the Soviets again, and peace terms from Moscow arrived on 29 August.

=== Ceasefire and peace ===
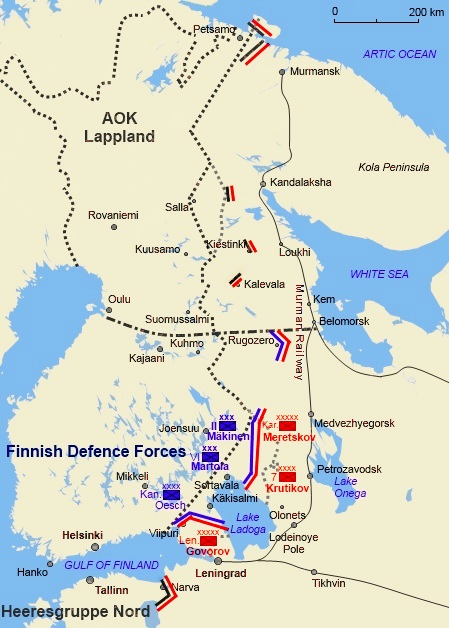
The front lines on 4 September 1944, when the ceasefire came into effect and two weeks before the war concluded.

Finland was required to return to the borders agreed to in the 1940 Moscow Peace Treaty, demobilise its armed forces, fulfill war reparations and cede the municipality of Petsamo. The Finns were also required to end any diplomatic relations with Germany immediately and to expel the Wehrmacht from Finnish territory by 15 September 1944; any troops remaining were to be disarmed, arrested and turned over to the Allies. The Finnish Parliament accepted those terms in a secret meeting on 2 September and requested for official negotiations for an armistice to begin. The Finnish Army implemented a ceasefire at 8:00 a.m. Helsinki time on 4 September. The Red Army followed suit a day later. On 14 September, a delegation led by Finnish Prime Minister Antti Hackzell and Foreign Minister Carl Enckell began negotiating, with the Soviet Union and the United Kingdom, the final terms of the Moscow Armistice, which eventually included additional stipulations from the Soviets. They were presented by Molotov on 18 September and accepted by the Finnish Parliament a day later.

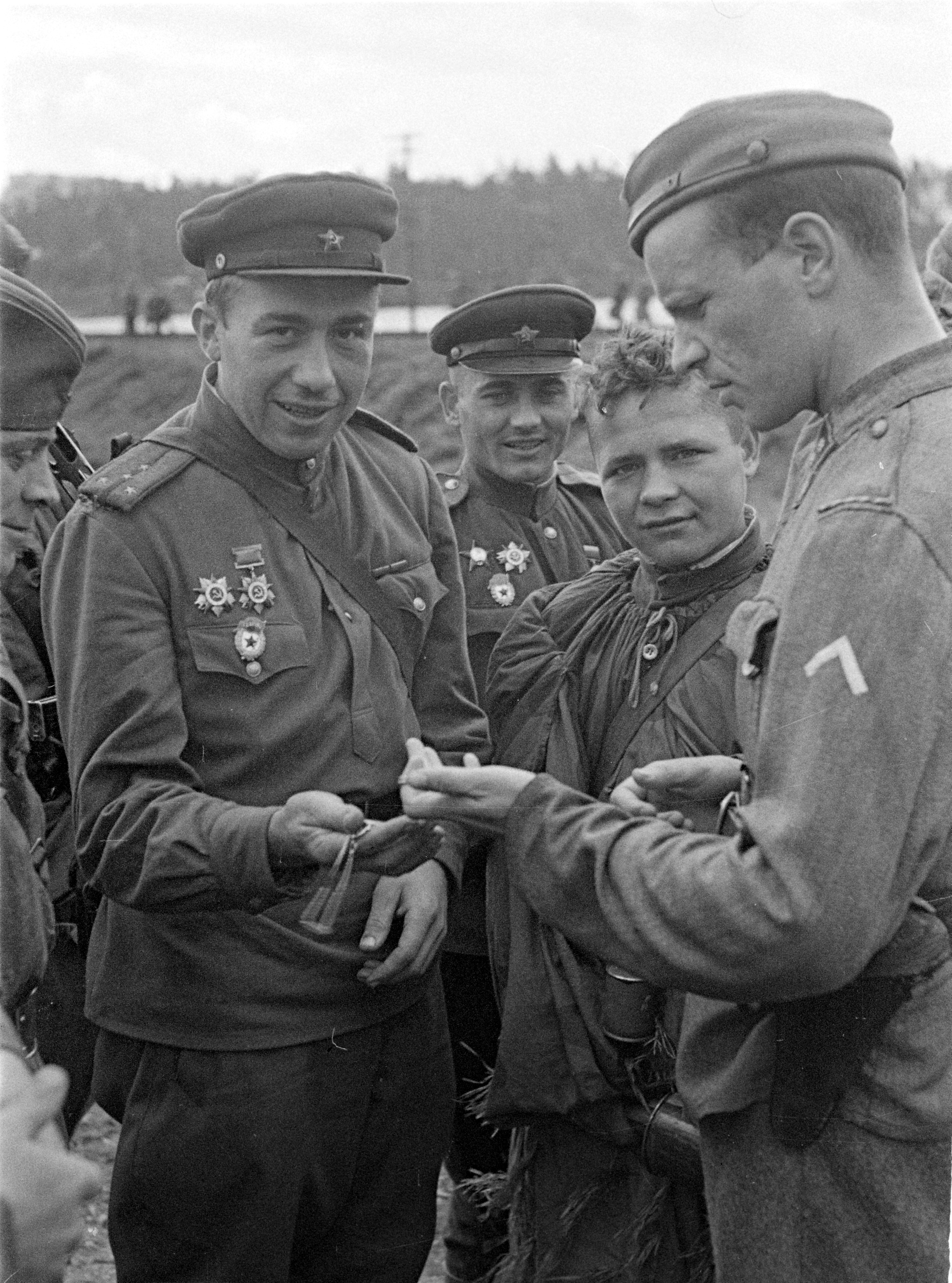
A Soviet (left) and a Finnish officer compare their watches on 4 September 1944 at Viipuri (Vyborg).

The motivations for the Soviet peace agreement with Finland are debated. Several Western historians stated that the original Soviet designs for Finland were no different from those for the Baltic countries. American political scientist Dan Reiter asserted that for Moscow, the control of Finland was necessary. Reiter and the British historian Victor Rothwell quoted Molotov as telling his Lithuanian counterpart in 1940, when the Soviets effectively annexed Lithuania, that minor states such as Finland, "will be included within the honourable family of Soviet peoples". Reiter stated that concern over severe losses pushed Stalin into accepting a limited outcome in the war rather than pursuing annexation, although some Soviet documents called for military occupation of Finland. He also wrote that Stalin had described territorial concessions, reparations and military bases as his objective with Finland to representatives from the UK, in December 1941, and the US, in March 1943, as well as the Tehran Conference. He believed that in the end, "Stalin's desire to crush Hitler quickly and decisively without distraction from the Finnish sideshow" concluded the war. Red Army officers captured as prisoners of war during the Battle of Tali-Ihantala revealed that their intention was to reach Helsinki, and that they were to be strengthened with reinforcements for this task. This was confirmed by intercepted Soviet radio messages.

Russian historian Nikolai Baryshnikov disputed the view that the Soviet Union sought to deprive Finland of its independence. He argued that there was no documentary evidence for such claims and that the Soviet government was always open for negotiations. Baryshnikov cited sources like the public information chief of Finnish Headquarters, Major Kalle Lehmus, to show that Finnish leadership had learned of the limited Soviet plans for Finland by at least July 1944 after intelligence revealed that some Soviet divisions were to be transferred to reserve in Leningrad. Finnish historian Heikki Ylikangas stated similar findings in 2009. According to him, the Soviets refocused their efforts in the summer of 1944 from the Finnish Front to defeating Germany, and Mannerheim received intelligence from Colonel Aladár Paasonen in June 1944 that the Soviet Union was aiming for peace, not occupation. Evidence of the Soviet leadership's intentions for the occupation of Finland has later been uncovered. In 2018, it was revealed that the Soviets designed and printed (in Goznak) new banknotes for Finland during the closing phases of the war, which were to be put into use after the planned occupation of the country.

== Aftermath and casualties ==
=== Finland and Germany ===
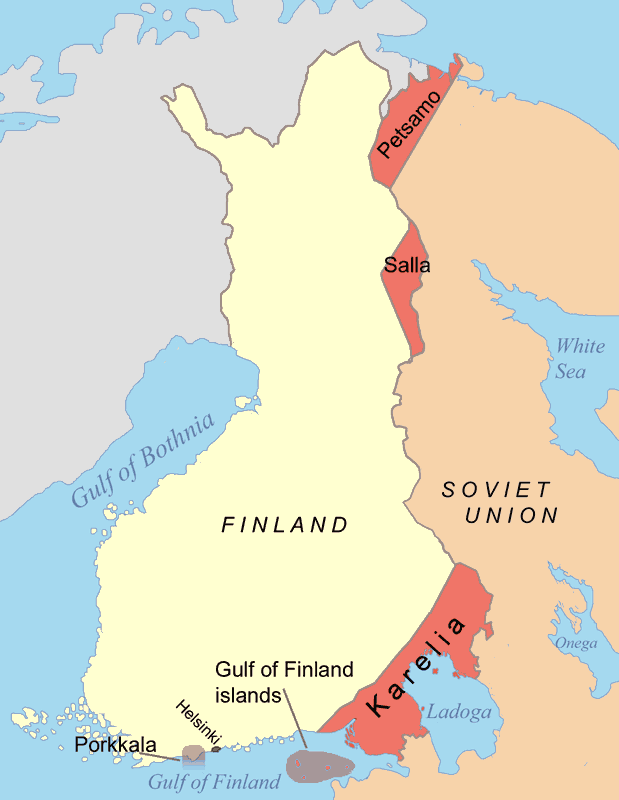
Areas ceded by Finland to the Soviet Union following the Moscow Armistice displayed in red.

According to Finnish historians, the casualties of the Finnish Defence Forces numbered 63,204 dead or missing and around 158,000 wounded. (Note: A detailed list of Finnish dead is as follows: Dead, buried: 33,565; Wounded, died of wounds: 12,820; Dead, not buried, declared as dead: 4,251; Missing, declared as dead: 3,552; Died as prisoners-of-war: 473; Other reasons (diseases, accidents, suicides): 7,932; Unknown: 611.) Officially, the Soviets captured 2,377 Finnish prisoners-of-war, but Finnish researchers estimated the number to be around 3,500 prisoners. A total of 939 Finnish civilians died in air raids and 190 civilians were killed by Soviet partisans. Germany suffered approximately 84,000 casualties in the Finnish front: 16,400 killed, 60,400 wounded and 6,800 missing. In addition to the original peace terms of restoring the 1940 border, Finland was required to pay war reparations to the USSR, conduct domestic war-responsibility trials, cede the municipality of Petsamo and lease the Porkkala Peninsula to the Soviets, as well as ban fascist elements and allow left-wing groups, such as the Communist Party of Finland. A Soviet-led Allied Control Commission was installed to enforce and monitor the peace agreement in Finland. The requirement to disarm or expel any German troops left on Finnish soil by 15 September 1944 eventually escalated into the Lapland War between Finland and Germany and the evacuation of the 200,000-strong 20th Mountain Army to Norway.

The Soviet demand for $600 million in war indemnities was reduced to $300 million (equivalent to $6.9 billion in 2025), most likely because of pressure from the US and the UK. After the ceasefire, the Soviets insisted for the payments to be based on 1938 prices, which doubled the de facto amount. The temporary Moscow Armistice was finalised without changes later in the 1947 Paris Peace Treaties. Henrik Lunde noted that Finland survived the war without losing its independence, unlike many of Germany's allies. Likewise, Helsinki, along with Moscow, was the only capital of a combatant nation that was not occupied in Continental Europe. In the longer term, Peter Provis analysed that by following self-censorship and limited appeasement policies as well as by fulfilling the Soviet demands, Finland avoided the fate of other nations that were annexed by the Soviets. Due to Soviet pressure, Finland decided not to accept economic aid from the Marshall Plan.

On 6 April 1948, Finland and the Soviet Union agreed to sign the Finno-Soviet Treaty of 1948, which was introduced since Finland wanted more political independence from the USSR and the Soviets sought to prevent Finland from being used by Western powers to invade the USSR. On 19 September 1955, Finland and the Soviet Union agreed to extend the Finno-Soviet Treaty of 1948 and the Soviets also agreed to return the Porkkala Peninsula to Finland. On 14 December 1955, Finland was admitted as a member state of the United Nations, along with Ireland, Italy, Spain, and other countries that had not been part of the Allies. In January 1956, twelve years after the beginning of the lease in 1944, the Soviets withdrew from their naval base on Porkkala and the peninsula was returned to Finnish sovereignty.

Many civilians who had been displaced after the Winter War had moved back to Karelia during the Continuation War and so had to be evacuated yet again. Of the 260,000 civilians who had returned to Karelia, only 19 chose to remain and become Soviet citizens. Most of the Ingrian Finns, together with Votes and Izhorians living in German-occupied Ingria, had been evacuated to Finland in 1943–1944. After the armistice, Finland was forced to return the evacuees. Soviet authorities did not allow the 55,733 returnees to resettle in Ingria and deported the Ingrian Finns to central regions of the Soviet Union.

=== Soviet Union ===
The war is considered a Soviet victory. According to Finnish historians, Soviet casualties in the Continuation War were not accurately recorded and various approximations have arisen. Russian historian Grigori Krivosheev estimated in 1997 that around 250,000 were killed or missing in action while 575,000 were medical casualties (385,000 wounded and 190,000 sick). Finnish author Nenye and others stated in 2016 that at least 305,000 were confirmed dead, or missing, according to the latest research and the number of wounded certainly exceeded 500,000. Of material losses, authors Jowett and Snodgrass state that 697 Soviet tanks were destroyed, 842 field artillery pieces captured, (Note: This number includes only those field artillery pieces which were captured in full condition or were later repaired to full condition and used by Finnish artillery. It does not include anti tank guns, anti aircraft guns or coastal guns captured. Armies do not usually leave undestroyed guns behind and we can assume that Soviet army was no exception. So the number of guns left behind and lost by Soviet army is likely much higher.) and 1,600 airplanes destroyed by Finnish fighter planes (1,030 by anti-aircraft fire and 75 by the Navy).

The number of Soviet prisoners of war in Finland was estimated by Finnish historians to be around 64,000, 56,000 of whom were captured in 1941. Around 2,600 to 2,800 Soviet prisoners of war were rendered to Germany in exchange for roughly 2,200 Finnish prisoners of war. Of the Soviet prisoners, at least 18,318 were documented to have died in Finnish prisoner of war camps. Finnish archival sources indicate that the highest mortality rates were observed in the largest prisoner of war camps, with mortality rates as high as 41%. For small camps, the comparable mortality rate was under 5%. Nearly 85% of the deaths happened between November 1941 and September 1942 with the highest monthly number of deaths, 2,665, recorded in February 1942. For comparison, the number of deaths in February 1943 was 92. Historian Oula Silvennoinen attributes the number of Soviet deaths to several factors, which include Finnish unpreparedness to handle unexpectedly large numbers of prisoners resulting in overcrowding, a lack of warm clothing among prisoners captured predominantly during the summer offensive, limited supplies of food (often made worse by camp personnel stealing food for themselves), and disease as a result of the previous factors. According to historian Antti Kujala, approximately 1,200 prisoners were shot, "most" of whom illegally.

The extent of Finland's participation in the siege of Leningrad, and whether Soviet civilian casualties during the siege should be attributed to the Continuation War, is debated and lacks a consensus (estimates of civilian deaths during the siege range from 632,253 to 1,042,000).

== In film and literature ==
Several literary and cinematic arrangements have been made on the basis of the Continuation War. The best-known story about the Continuation War is Väinö Linna's novel The Unknown Soldier (Finnish: Tuntematon sotilas), which was the basis for three films in 1955, 1985, and 2017. There is also a 1999 film Ambush, based on a novel by Antti Tuuri on the events in Rukajärvi, Karelia, and a 2007 film 1944: The Final Defence, based on the Battle of Tali-Ihantala. The final stages of the Continuation War were the primary focus of Soviet director Yuli Raizman's 1945 documentary entitled A Propos of the Truce with Finland (Russian: К вопросу о перемирии с Финляндией). The documentary illustrates the strategic operations that led to the breakthrough on the Karelian Isthmus by the Soviets as well as how Soviet propaganda presented the war overall. The film is titled Läpimurto Kannaksella ja rauhanneuvottelut in Finnish.

== See also ==
- Brezhnev Doctrine
- Cold-weather warfare
- Einsatzkommando Finnland
- Lotta Svärd
- List of wars involving Finland
- Finland–Russia relations
- Finnish war children
- Salpa Line
- Stalin Line
- Volkhov Front

== Bibliography ==
=== English ===
- Barber, John (2017). Foreword. Leningrad 1941–42: Morality in a City under Siege. By Yarov, Sergey. John Wiley & Sons. ISBN 978-1-5095-0802-0. Archived from the original on 27 February 2018.
- Brinkley, Douglas (2004). The World War II Desk Reference. New York: HarperCollins. ISBN 978-0-06-052651-1.
- Clements, Jonathan (2012). Mannerheim: President, Soldier, Spy. Haus Publishing. ISBN 978-1-908323-18-7. Archived from the original on 25 April 2023.
- Corum, James S. (2004). "The Luftwaffe and its Allied Air Forces in World War II: Parallel War and the Failure of Strategic and Economic Cooperation". Air Power History. 51 (2): 4–19. ISSN 1044-016X. JSTOR 26274547.
- Davies, Norman (2006). Europe at War: 1939–1945: No Simple Victory. Macmillan. ISBN 978-0-333-69285-1. Archived from the original on 21 February 2018.
- Erickson, John (1993). The Road to Berlin: Stalin's War with Germany. New Haven: Yale University Press. ISBN 0-300-07813-7. Archived from the original on 25 April 2023.
- Gebhardt, James (1990). "The Petsamo-Kirkenes Operation: Soviet Breakthrough and Pursuit in the Arctic, October 1944" (PDF). Leavenworth Papers (17). Fort Leavenworth: Combat Studies Institute, U.S. Army Command and General Staff College. ISSN 0195-3451. Archived (PDF) from the original on 11 February 2018.
- Glantz, David; House, Jonathan (1998). When Titans Clashed: How the Red Army Stopped Hitler. Lawrence: University Press of Kansas. ISBN 978-0-7006-0899-7.
- Glantz, David (1998). Stumbling Colossus: The Red Army on the Eve of World War. Lawrence: University Press of Kansas. ISBN 0-7006-0879-6.
- Glantz, David (2001). The Siege of Leningrad 1941–1944: 900 Days of Terror. Zenith Press. ISBN 0-7603-0941-8.
- Glantz, David (2002). The Battle for Leningrad: 1941–1944. University Press of Kansas. ISBN 978-0-7006-1208-6.
- Glantz, David (2005). Companion to Colossus Reborn: Key Documents and Statistics. University Press of Kansas. ISBN 978-0-7006-1359-5.
- Goda, Norman J. W. (2015). "The diplomacy of the Axis, 1940–1945". The Cambridge History of the Second World War. 2: 276–300. doi:10.1017/CHO9781139524377.015. ISBN 978-1-139-52437-7. Archived from the original on 17 December 2020.
- Grier, Howard (2007). Hitler, Dönitz, and the Baltic Sea: the Third Reich's last hope, 1944–1945. Annapolis: US Naval Institute Press. ISBN 978-1-59114-345-1. Archived from the original on 25 April 2023.
- Hanhimäki, Jussi M. (1997). Containing Coexistence: America, Russia, and the "Finnish Solution". Kent State University Press. ISBN 978-0-87338-558-9.
- Jakobson, Max (1969). Finnish Neutrality: A Study of Finnish Foreign Policy Since the Second World War. New York: Praegar. ISBN 978-0-238-78818-5.
- Jägerskiöld, Stig (1986). Mannerheim: Marshal of Finland. Minneapolis: University of Minnesota Press. ISBN 0-8166-1527-6.
- Jones, Michael (2009). Leningrad: State of Siege. Hodder & Stoughton. ISBN 978-1-84854-121-4. Archived from the original on 22 February 2018.
- Jowett, Philip; Snodgrass, Brent (2012). Finland at War 1939–45. Bloomsbury Publishing. ISBN 978-1-78200-156-0. Archived from the original on 25 April 2023.
- Jutikkala, Eino; Pirinen, Kauko (1988). A History of Finland. Dorset Press. ISBN 0-88029-260-1.
- Kinnunen, Tiina; Kivimäki, Ville (2011). Finland in World War II: History, Memory, Interpretations. BRILL. ISBN 978-90-04-20894-0. Archived from the original on 25 April 2023.
- Kirby, David (2006). A concise history of Finland. Cambridge: Cambridge University Press. ISBN 978-0-521-53989-0.
- Kirchubel, Robert (2013). Operation Barbarossa: The German Invasion of Soviet Russia. Bloomsbury Publishing. ISBN 978-1-4728-0471-6. Archived from the original on 25 April 2023.
- Kirschenbaum, Lisa A. (2006). The Legacy of the Siege of Leningrad, 1941–1995: Myth, Memories, and Monuments. Cambridge University Press. ISBN 978-1-139-46065-1. Archived from the original on 25 February 2018.
- Krivosheev, Grigori F. (1997). Soviet Casualties and Combat Losses in the Twentieth Century. Greenhill Books. ISBN 978-1-85367-280-4. Archived from the original on 22 February 2018.
- Laar, Mart (2005). Estonia in World War II. Tallinn: Grenader. ISBN 978-9949-411-93-1. Archived from the original on 24 February 2018.
- Lukacs, John (2006). June 1941: Hitler and Stalin. Yale University Press. ISBN 978-0-300-11437-9.
- Lunde, Henrik O. (2011). Finland's War of Choice: The Troubled German-Finnish Alliance in World War II. Newbury: Casemate Publishers. ISBN 978-1-61200-037-4.
- Mann, Chris; Jörgensen, Christer (2016). Hitler's Arctic War: The German Campaigns in Norway, Finland and the USSR 1940-1945. Barnsley, England: Pen & Sword Books. ISBN 978-1-47388-456-4.
- Morgan, Kevin (2005). Cohen, Gidon; Flinn, Andrew (eds.). Agents of the Revolution: New Biographical Approaches to the History of International Communism in the Age of Lenin and Stalin. Peter Lang. ISBN 978-3-03910-075-0. Archived from the original on 2 March 2018.
- Mouritzen, Hans (1997). External Danger and Democracy: Old Nordic Lessons and New European Challenges. Dartmouth. ISBN 978-1-85521-885-7. Archived from the original on 22 February 2018.
- Nenye, Vesa; Munter, Peter; Wirtanen, Toni; Birks, Chris (2016). Finland at War: The Continuation and Lapland Wars 1941–45. Osprey Publishing. ISBN 978-1-4728-1526-2.
- Nissen, Henrik S., ed. (1983). Scandinavia during the Second World War. Translated by Munch-Petersen, Thomas. Minneapolis: University of Minnesota Press. ISBN 978-0-8166-1110-2.
- Nordstrom, Byron J. (2000). Scandinavia Since 1500. Minneapolis: University of Minnesota Press. ISBN 978-0-8166-2098-2.
- Pajunen, Julia; Korsberg, Hanna (16 November 2017). "Performing Memory, Challenging History: Two Adaptations of The Unknown Soldier". Contemporary Theatre Review. 28 (2): 224–234. doi:10.1080/10486801.2017.1365715. hdl:10138/299526. ISSN 1048-6801.
- Peri, Alexis (2017). The War Within. Harvard University Press. ISBN 978-0-674-97155-4. Archived from the original on 25 February 2018.
- Reiter, Dan (2009). How Wars End. Princeton University Press. ISBN 978-1-4008-3103-6.
- Rothwell, Victor (2006). War Aims in the Second World War: The War Aims of the Key Belligerents 1939–1945. Edinburgh University Press. ISBN 978-0-7486-1503-2.
- Rutherford, Jeff (2014). Combat and Genocide on the Eastern Front: The German Infantry's War, 1941–1944. Cambridge University Press. ISBN 978-1-107-05571-1. Archived from the original on 27 February 2018.
- Salisbury, Harrison E. (1969). The 900 Days: The Siege of Leningrad (1 ed.). New York: Harper & Row. ISBN 978-0-06-013732-8.
- Scott, James Wesley; Liikanen, Ilkka (2013). European Neighbourhood Through Civil Society Networks?: Policies, Practices and Perceptions. Routledge. ISBN 978-1-317-98345-3.
- Silvennoinen, Oula (2012). "Limits of Intentionality: Soviet Prisoners-of-War and Civilian Internees in Finnish Custody". In Kinnunen, Tiina; Kivimäki, Ville (eds.). Finland in World War I: History, Memory, Interpretations. History of Warfare. Vol. 69. Brill. pp. 355–394. doi:10.1163/9789004214330_010. ISBN 978-90-04-21433-0.
- Stewart, Richard W., ed. (2010). American Military History Volume II: The United States Army in a Global Era, 1917–2008 (2nd ed.). ISBN 978-0-16-084184-2.
- Stahel, David (2018). Joining Hitler's Crusade. Cambridge University Press. ISBN 978-1-316-51034-6. Archived from the original on 25 April 2023.
- Sturtivant, Ray (1990). British Naval Aviation: The Fleet Air Arm 1917–1990. London: Arms & Armour Press Ltd. ISBN 0-85368-938-5.
- Suvorov, Viktor (2013). The Chief Culprit: Stalin's Grand Design to Start World War II. Naval Institute Press. ISBN 978-1-61251-268-6. Archived from the original on 22 February 2018.
- Taagepera, Rein (2013). The Finno-Ugric Republics and the Russian State. Routledge. ISBN 978-1-136-67808-0.
- Tallgren, Immi (2014). "Martyrs and Scapegoats of the Nation? The Finnish War-Responsibility Trial, 1945–1946". Historical Origins of International Criminal Law. 2 (21). Archived from the original on 28 October 2020.
- Treaties of Peace with Italy, Bulgaria, Hungary, Roumania, and Finland. United States Government Printing Office. 1947. OCLC 3291142.
- Trotter, Willian R. (1991). A Frozen Hell: The Russo-Finnish Winter War of 1939–1940. Algonquin Books. ISBN 978-1-56512-249-9.
- Turtola, Martti (2000). "Risto Ryti". In Marjomaa, Ulpu (ed.). 100 Faces from Finland. Finnish Literature Society. ISBN 951-746-215-8.
- Vehviläinen, Olli (2002). Finland in the Second World War: Between Germany and Russia. New York: Palgrave. ISBN 0-333-80149-0.
- Weeks, Albert L. (2004). Russia's Life-Saver: Lend-Lease Aid to the U.S.S.R. in World War II. Lexington Books. ISBN 978-0-7391-0736-2..
- Werth, Alexander (1999). Russia at War, 1941–1945 (2 ed.). New York: Basic Books. ISBN 978-0-7867-0722-5.
- Westerlund, Lars (2008). "The Mortality Rate of Prisoners of War in Finnish Custody between 1939 and 1944". In Westerlund, Lars (ed.). Prisoners of War deaths and people handed over to Germany and the Soviet Union in 1939–55. A Research Report by the Finnish National Archives. National Archives of Finland. ISBN 978-951-53-3140-3. Archived from the original on 6 October 2023.
- Zapotoczny, Walter S. Jr. (2017). Decima Flottiglia MAS: The Best Commandos of the Second World War. Fonthill Media. ISBN 978-1-62545-113-2. Archived from the original on 21 February 2018.
- Zeiler, Thomas W.; DuBois, Daniel M., eds. (2012). "Scandinavian Campaigns". A Companion to World War II. Wiley Blackwell Companions to World History. Vol. 11. Wiley-Blackwell. ISBN 978-1-4051-9681-9. Archived from the original on 25 April 2023.
- Ziemke, Earl F. (2002). Stalingrad to Berlin: The German Defeat in the East (PDF). Center of Military History, United States Army. ISBN 1-78039-287-7. Archived from the original (PDF) on 20 September 2015.
- Ziemke, Earl F. (2015). German Northern Theater of Operations 1940–1945 (Illustrated ed.). Pickle Partners Publishing. ISBN 978-1-78289-977-8. Archived from the original on 25 April 2023.

=== Finnish and Russian ===
- Ahtokari, Reijo; Pale, Erkki (1998). Suomen radiotiedustelu 1927–1944 [Finnish radio intelligence 1927–1944]. Helsinki: Hakapaino Oy. ISBN 978-952-90-9437-0.
- Baryshnikov, Nikolai I. (2002). Блокада Ленинграда и Финляндия 1941–1944 [Finland and the Siege of Leningrad 1941–1944] (in Russian). St. Petersburg: Johan Beckman Institute. ISBN 952-5412-10-5. Archived from the original on 1 February 2014.
- Baryshnikov, Nikolai I. (2006). Феномен фальши: 'Победа в противостоянии' [The Phenomenon of Lies: 'The Victory in the Confrontation']. St. Petersburg and the Countries of Northern Europe (in Russian). St. Petersburg: Russian Christian Humanitarian Academy. Archived from the original on 2 November 2013.
- Baryshnikov, Vladimir N. (2002v). "Проблема обеспечения безопасности Ленинграда с севера в свете осуществления советского военного планирования 1932–1941 гг" [The problem of ensuring the security of Leningrad from the north in the light of the implementation of the Soviet military planning of 1932–1941]. St. Petersburg and the Countries of Northern Europe (in Russian). St. Petersburg: Russian Christian Humanitarian Academy. Archived from the original on 9 December 2007.
- Dzeniskevich, A.R.; et al. (1970). Непокоренный Ленинград. раткий очерк истории города в период Великой Отечественной войны [Unconquered Leningrad. A short outline of the history of the city during the Great Patriotic War] (in Russian). The Academy of Sciences of the USSR. Archived from the original on 7 November 2011.
- Enkenberg, Ilkka (2021). Jatkosota Päivä Päivältä (in Finnish). Readme.fi. ISBN 978-952-373-249-0.
- Haavikko, Paavo (1999). Päämaja – Suomen hovi (in Finnish). Art House. ISBN 951-884-265-5.
- Hietanen, Silvo (1992). "Evakkovuosi 1944 – jälleen matkassa" [Evacuation 1944 – On the Road Again]. Kansakunta sodassa [A nation at war] (in Finnish). Vol. 3. Helsinki: Valtion Painatuskeskus. ISBN 978-951-861-385-8.
- Jokipii, Mauno (1999). Финляндия на пути к войне: Исследование о военном сотрудничестве Германии и Финляндии в 1940–1941 гг [Birth of the Continuation War: Research of German–Finnish Military Collaboration 1940–1941] (in Russian). Petrozavodsk: Karelia. ISBN 5-7545-0735-6.
- Juutilainen, Antti (1994). Ilomantsi – lopultakin voitto (in Finnish). Rauma: Kirjapaino Oy West Point. ISBN 951-95218-5-2.
- Kiljanen, Kalervo (1968). Suomen Laivasto 1918–1968, II [Finnish Navy 1918–1968, II] (in Finnish). Helsinki: Meriupseeriyhdistys/Otava.
- Koskimaa, Matti (1993). Veitsen terällä: vetäytyminen Länsi-Kannakselta ja Talin-Ihantalan suurtaistelu kesällä 1944 (in Finnish). Porvoo: WSOY. ISBN 951-0-18811-5.
- Kovalevsky, N. F. (2009). "Боевой состав Красной Армии и Военно-морского флота СССР на 22 июня 1941 года" [The combat composition of the Red Army and the Navy of the USSR on June 22, 1941]. Военно-исторический журнал [Military Historical Journal (VIZH)] (in Russian). No. 6.
- Kujala, Antti (2009). "Illegal Killing of Soviet Prisoners of War by Finns during the Finno-Soviet Continuation War of 1941–44". Slavonic and East European Review. 87 (3): 429–451. doi:10.1353/see.2009.0040. ISSN 2222-4327.
- Leskinen, Jari; Juutilainen, Antti, eds. (2005). Jatkosodan pikkujättiläinen [The Little Giant of the Continuation War] (in Finnish) (1st ed.). WSOY. ISBN 978-951-0-28690-6.
- Manninen, Ohto (1994). Molotovin cocktail – Hitlerin sateenvarjo [Molotov's cocktail – Hitler's umbrella] (in Finnish). Helsinki: Painatuskeskus. ISBN 951-37-1495-0.
- Mäkelä, Jukka (1967). Helsinki liekeissä: suurpommitukset helmikuussa 1944 [Helsinki Burning: Great Raids in February 1944] (in Finnish). Helsinki: W. Söderström Oy. Archived from the original on 25 April 2023.
- Meltyukhov, Mikhail I. (2000). Упущенный шанс Сталина. Советский Союз и борьба за Европу: 1939–1941 [Stalin's Missed Chance – The Soviet Union and the Struggle for Europe: 1939–1941] (in Russian). Вече. ISBN 5-7838-0590-4. Archived from the original on 28 July 2009.
- Moisala, U. E.; Alanen, Pertti (1988). Kun hyökkääjän tie pysäytettiin (in Finnish). Keuruu: Otava. ISBN 951-1-10386-5.
- Nikunen, Heikki; Talvitie, Jyrki K.; Keskinen, Kalevi (2011). Suomen ilmasodan pikkujättiläinen (in Finnish). Helsinki: WSOY. ISBN 978-951-0-36871-8.
- Paulaharju, Jyri; Sinerma, Matti; Koskimaa, Matti (1994). Suomen kenttätykistön historia II Osa (in Finnish). Helsinki: Suomen Kenttätykistön säätiö. ISBN 952-9055110.
- Paulman, F. I. (1980). "Начало освобождения Советской Эстонии". От Нарвы до Сырве [From Narva to Sõrve] (in Russian). Tallinn: Eesti Raamat.
- Raunio, Ari; Kilin, Juri (2007). Jatkosodan hyökkäystaisteluja 1941 [Offensive Battles of the Continuation War 1941] (in Finnish). Keuruu: Otavan Kirjapaino Oy. ISBN 978-951-593-069-9.
- Raunio, Ari; Kilin, Juri (2008). Jatkosodan torjuntataisteluja 1942–44 [Defensive Battles of the Continuation War 1942–44] (in Finnish). Keuruu: Otavan Kirjapaino Oy. ISBN 978-951-593-070-5.
- Suprun, Mikhail (1997). Ленд-лиз и северные конвои: 1941–1945 гг [Lend-Lease and Northern Convoys: 1941–1945]. Андреевский флаг. ISBN 5-85608-081-5.
- Valtanen, Jaakko (1958). "Jäämeren rannikon sotatoimet toisen maailmansodan aikana". Tiede Ja Ase (in Finnish): 82–125. ISSN 0358-8882. Archived from the original on 2 March 2018.
- Virkkunen, Sakari (1985). Myrskyajan presidentti Ryti (in Finnish). Otava. ISBN 951-1-08557-3.
- Virrankoski, Pentti (2009). Suomen historia [A History of Finland] (in Finnish). Vol. 1, 2. Finnish Literature Society. ISBN 978-952-222-160-5.
- Ylikangas, Heikki (2009). Yhden miehen jatkosota [One Man's Continuation War] (in Finnish). Otava. ISBN 978-951-1-24054-9.
