= Military Historical Journal =

Russian monthly journal

- Discipline: Military history
- Language: Russian, English (abstracts)
- Edited by: Igor Chachukh

Publication details
- Former name(s): The Journal of Military History
- History: 1939–present
- Publisher: Ministry of Defense (Russia)
- Frequency: Monthly
- ISO 4: Find out here

Indexing
- ISSN: 0321-0626

Links
- Journal homepage; Online archive

The Military Historical Journal (Russian: Военно-исторический журнал, romanized: Voenno-istorichesky zhurnal) is a monthly Russian journal focused on military history. Initially published by the People's Commissariat of Defense of the Soviet Union between 1939 and 1941, publication was resumed in 1959 by the Ministry of Defense of the Soviet Union and has carried on since. After the dissolution of the Soviet Union, publication was taken over by the Ministry of Defense of the Russian Federation.

It is included in the list of peer-reviewed scientific publications recommended by the Higher Attestation Commission of the Ministry of Science and Higher Education of the Russian Federation. In English-language publications, the abbreviation used for the Military Historical Journal is VIZh.

== History ==
The Military Historical Journal was established as an organ of the People's Commissariat of Defense of the Soviet Union by Order No. 85 of People's Commissar of Defense Kliment Voroshilov on 5 May 1939, based on the decision of the Central Committee of the All-Union Communist Party (Bolsheviks) on 29 April that year. It ran its first issue on 29 August 1939, with Chief of the General Staff, Komandarm 1st Rank Boris Shaposhnikov as its first editor-in-chief.

The journal ceased publication in 1941 due to World War II and merged with Military Thought, but was relaunched in 1959 and used intensively by the Soviet Armed Forces for a theoretical reevaluation of military theory and tactics; a large number of articles covered the performance of the Soviet Union in World War II, and the Red Army in particular. With the dissolution of the Soviet Union, the journal passed to the succeeding Ministry of Defense of the Russian Federation, which also made the previously more secluded journal face a much broader public audience. By its own definition, the journal aims to cover "military policy of the Russian state", "historical experience of national security", and "activities of outstanding Russian and Soviet army and naval leaders".

The archive broadly follows a pro-Russian and pro-Soviet agenda; for example, the suffering of the Polish victims of the 1940 Katyn massacre, perpetrated by the Soviet NKVD, was explicitly equivocated with the suffering of Soviet prisoners of the 1920 Polish–Soviet War. The analysis and documentation in this and other pieces of coverage has been criticized by historian David R. Stone as insufficiently balanced.

In 2012, the journal had a circulation of 4,200 copies. The editorial board is staffed by Russian intellectuals as well as by officers of the Russian Armed Forces.

== Editors-in-chief ==
The following people are or have been editor-in-chief:

- 1939–1940: Boris Shaposhnikov
- 1940–1941: Nikolai Talensky
- 1959–1967: Nikolai Pavlenko
- 1967–1982: Viktor Matsulenko
- 1982–1986: Aleksandr Yevseyev
- 1986–1988: Anatoly Khorkov
- 1988–1991: Viktor Filatov
- 1991–1993: Valentin Yeshchenko
- 1994–1999: Vyacheslav Minayev
- 1999–2007: Ivan Anfertyev
- 2008–present: Igor Chachukh

== Abstracting and indexing ==
The Military Historical Journal is abstracted and indexed in the Russian Science Citation Index.
