= Viktor Filatov =

Russian journalist (1935–2019)

Viktor Ivanovich Filatov (Russian: Виктор Иванович Филатов, 25 September 1935 in Magnitogorsk, Chelyabinsk Oblast, Soviet Union — 29 May 2019) was a Russian journalist. In his military career he reached a rank of major-general. He was press-secretary of Vladimir Zhirinovsky and the editor-in-chief of the newspaper LDPR of the nationalist Liberal Democratic Party of Russia.

Filatov hosted an antisemitic web-site which he called "The call from the Battlegrounds of the Jewish Empire".
