= Dan Reiter =

American political scientist (born 1967)

Dan Reiter (born 29 September 1967, in Ann Arbor, Michigan) is an American political scientist.Since 2014, he has been the Samuel Candler Dobbs Professor at the Department of Political Science at Emory University.

== Education ==
Reiter received his B.A. with honors in political science from Northwestern University in 1989 and his Ph.D. in political science from the University of Michigan in 1994. He was a John M. Olin postdoctoral fellow in national security at Harvard University from 1994 to 1995.

== Academic career ==
Reiter has had a number of articles published in leading peer-reviewed journals, including the American Political Science Review and World Politics. His book, How Wars End, was the recipient of a 2010 Best Book Award from the American Political Science Association.

== Bibliography ==
Crucible of Beliefs: Learning, Alliances and World Wars (Cornell University Press, 1996)
Democracies at War (Princeton University Press, 2002)
Preventive War and Its Alternatives: The Lessons of History (Strategic Studies Institute, U.S., Army War College, 2006)
How Wars End (Princeton University Press, 2009)
