= Einsatzstab Fähre Ost =

2nd world war glimpse

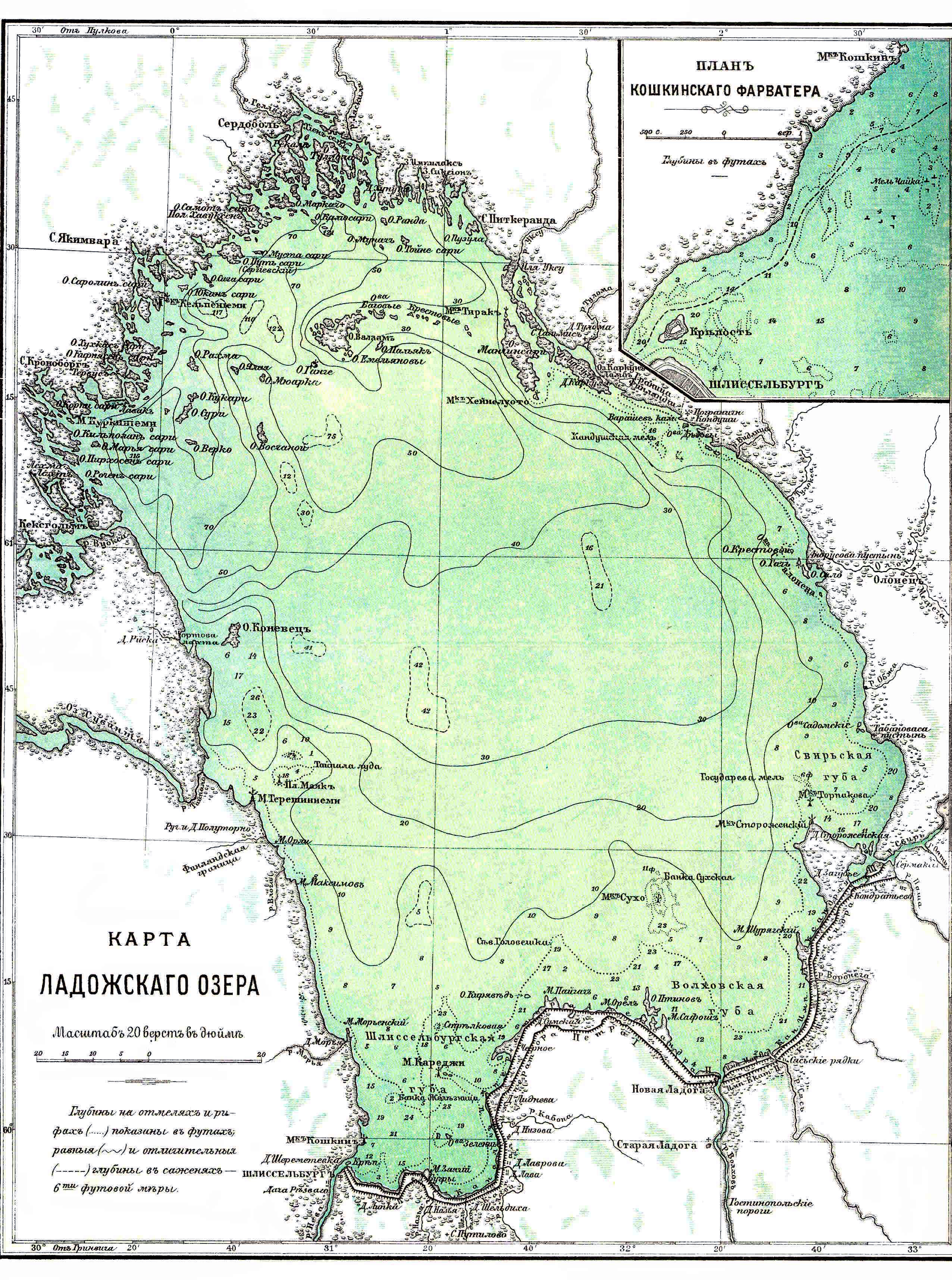
Map of Lake Ladoga (in pre-reform Russian orthography), as illustrated in the Brockhaus and Efron Encyclopedic Dictionary (vol. XVII, 1896)

The Einsatzstab Fähre Ost (lit. 'Ferry Operations Staff East'), referred to as EFO, was a German naval detachment operated by the Luftwaffe during the Second World War. It saw action on Lake Ladoga supporting other Axis units in the siege of Leningrad.

== Background ==
Following the German invasion of the Soviet Union in June 1941 and the commencement of hostilities between Finland and the USSR (the Continuation War), Lake Ladoga became a battleground when the city of Leningrad came under siege. To operate against Soviet forces around the lake, and against the city's only supply line, the Road of Life, the Finns formed their Ladoga Flotilla, joined in the summer of 1942 by the international Naval Detachment K.

== Formation ==
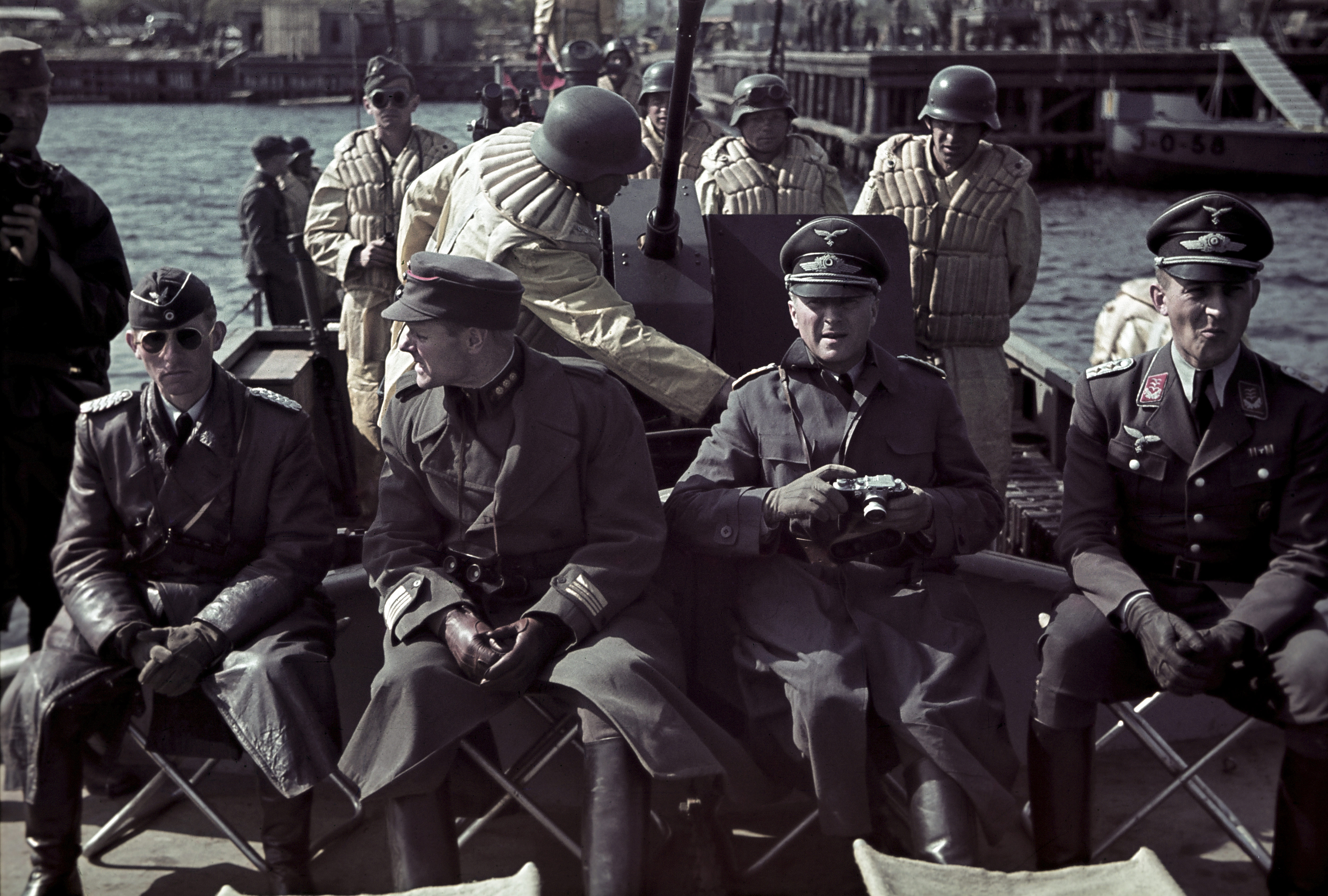
German Luftwaffe officers and Finnish Eversti Bror Kraemer on board an infantry boat (I-boat) during the Axis naval review at Lakhdenpokhya on Lake Ladoga, 13 August 1942; this I-boat was armed with a 2 cm Flak 38 in addition to 7.92 mm machine guns

Between 13 June and 15 August 1942, the Ladoga flotilla was strengthened by the arrival of two German naval contingents: Luftwaffen-Fährenflottille II and Luftwaffen-Fährenflottille III. These units had been formed in May 1942 at the Belgian port of Antwerp and united into the Einsatzstab Fähre Ost (EFO) for duty on Lake Ladoga. The battlegroups acted independently but maintained close operational ties with Naval Detachment K. They were made up of twenty-three Siebel ferries (seven heavy-artillery-type ferries mounting two to four 88 mm guns each; six light-artillery-type ferries mounting smaller-caliber flak guns; six transport, six repair, one hospital and one HQ ferries), as well as nine infantry boats (German: Infanterietransporter „Siebelgefäß“, lit. 'Siebel Vessel infantry transporter', a.k.a. I-Boot, 'I-boat'), each capable of carrying 40 fully equipped soldiers. Four of these boats were outfitted as minesweepers; three were kept as transports; one was rigged as a hospital boat and one as a HQ boat. In addition, another heavy assault boat (German: schweres Sturmboot) also acted as a HQ boat.

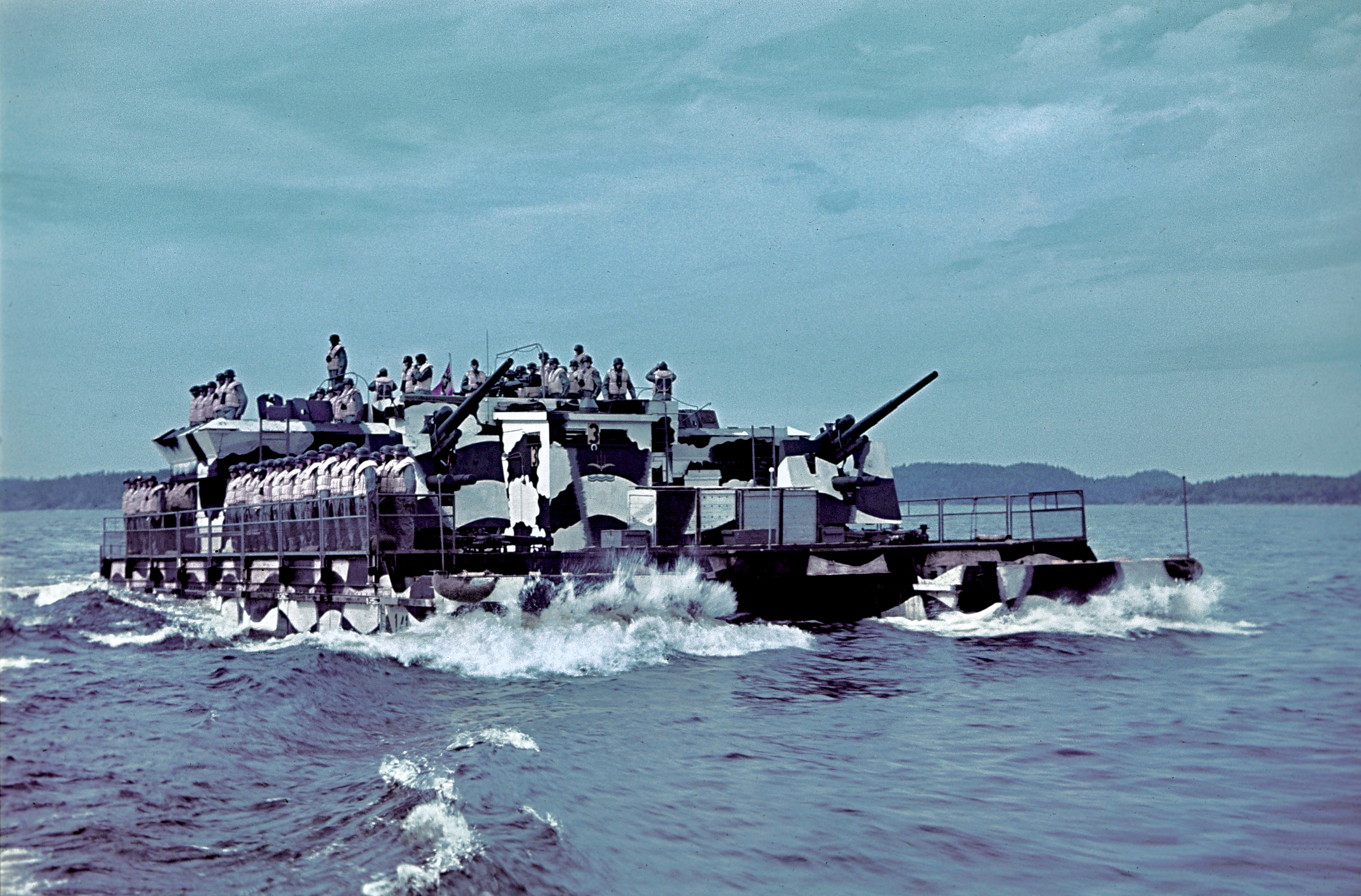
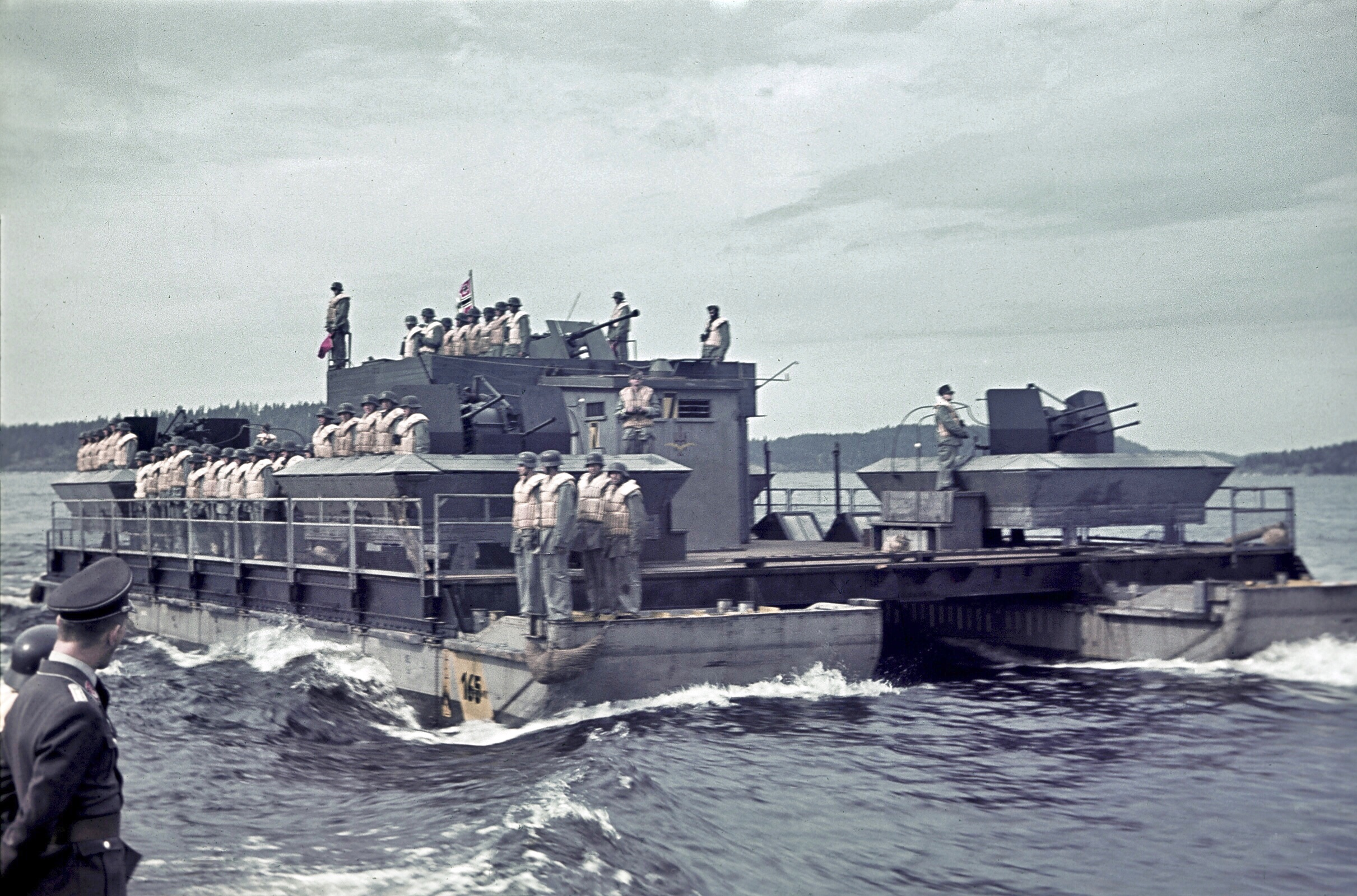
A German heavy (top) and a light (bottom) artillery Siebel ferry during the Axis naval review at Lakhdenpokhya on Lake Ladoga, 13 August 1942

The Siebel ferries were originated by aircraft designer Friedrich ('Fritz') Siebel and intended for use in Germany's planned 1940 invasion of England, Operation Sea Lion. They consisted of two heavy army bridging pontoons braced together with iron cross-beams and covered by a sturdy wooden deck. The ferries initially had a pair of Ford V-8 truck engines in each aft pontoon end, connected to standard water screws. Further power came from three 600 PS (590 hp) surplus aircraft engines mounted on an elevated scaffolding spanning the rear deck. The aircraft engines, however, were later dispensed with as they consumed considerable fuel and required excessive maintenance. Siebel ferries displaced approximately 140–170 tonnes, depending on type, and could travel up to 570 km (350 mi; 310 nmi) at 8 knots (9.2 mph; 15 km/h). With their low freeboard and wide flat deck, they were easily configured for a variety of purposes.

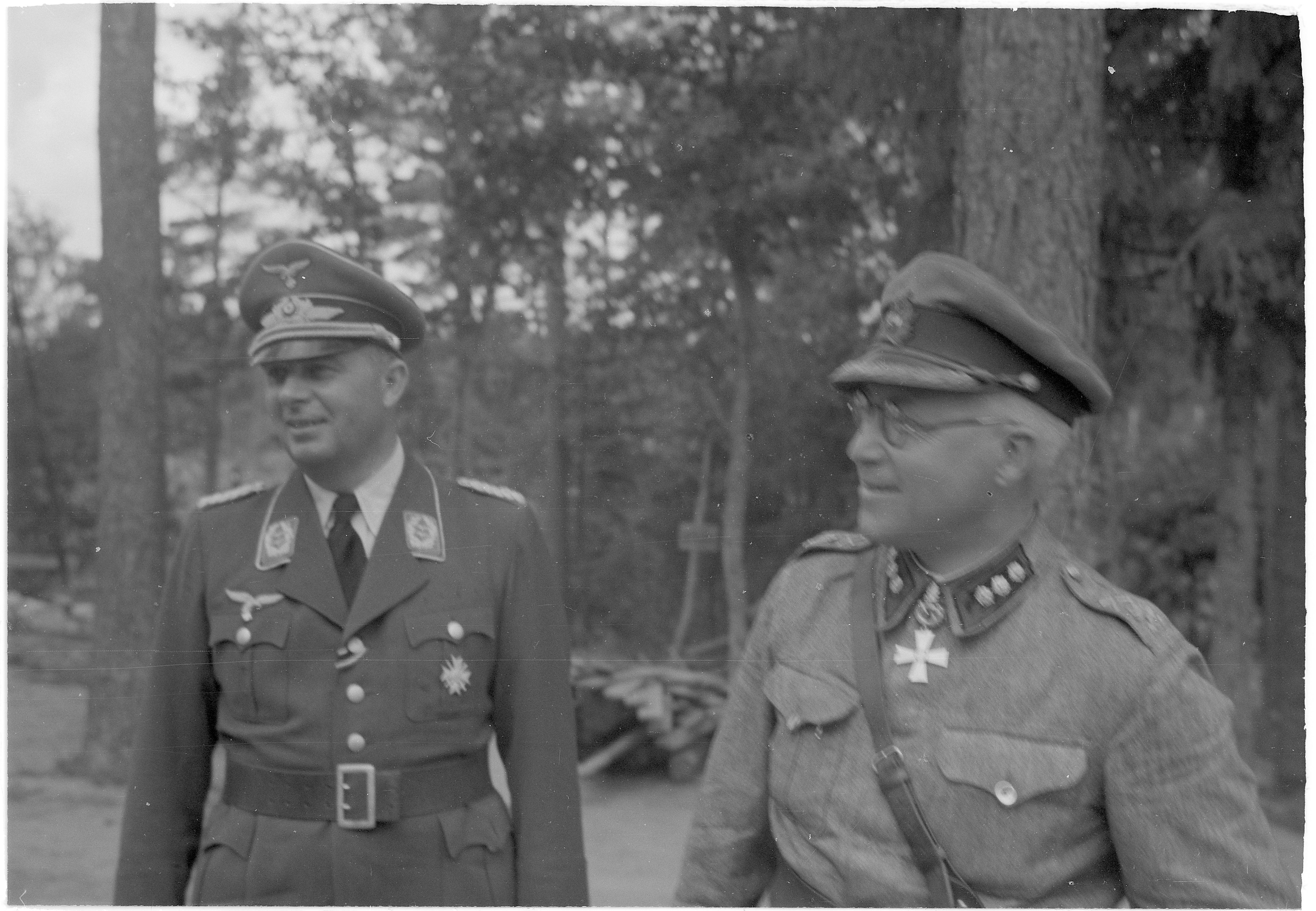
The EFO Commander, Oberstleutnant Fritz Siebel (left), and the Finnish Ladoga Coastal Defense Brigade Commander, Eversti Eino Järvinen, in Lakhdenpokhya on July 3, 1942

In all, Oberstleutnant Fritz Siebel had a total of 30 vessels with 2,400 personnel under his command.

== Operations ==
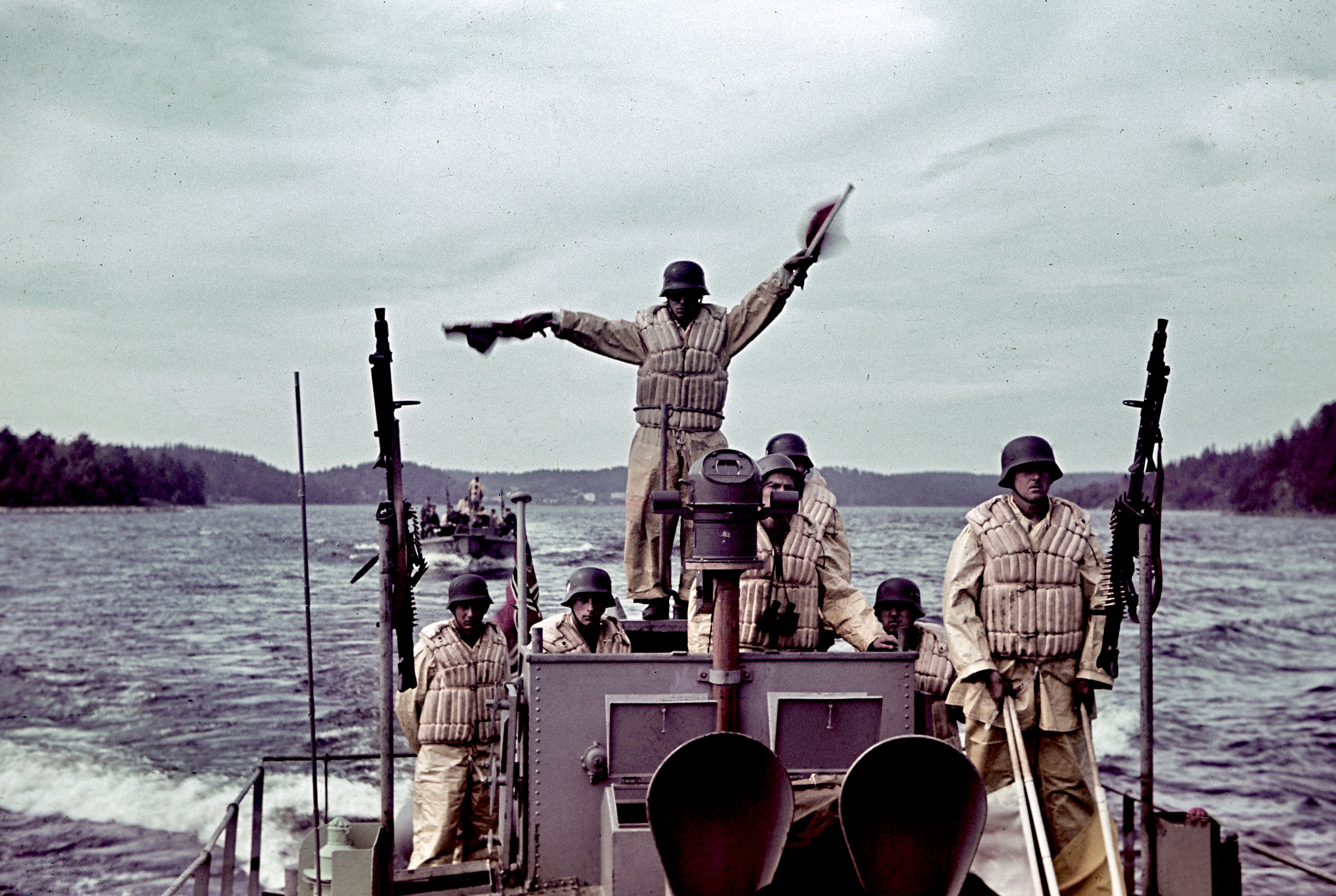
EFO infantry boats (I-boats) during the Axis naval review at Lakhdenpokhya on Lake Ladoga, 13 August 1942

The EFO suffered losses during a raid to destroy a Soviet radio station, lighthouse and coastal artillery emplacements on the strategically important Sukho Island (Russian: Сухо; Finnish: Suhosaari) c. 20 km (12 mi; 11 nmi) from the southern coast of Ladoga, at the main supply route to Leningrad. The idea of the operation was presented to the Germans by the Finnish Kenraaliluutnantti Paavo Talvela.

The German-run operation, codenamed Operation Brasil (lit. 'Brazil'), began on the evening of October 21, 1942; by the morning of October 22, 1942, Axis forces had reached Sukho Island and launched an attack. Though the radio station and the lighthouse were damaged and the coastal artillery on the island was almost destroyed, the landing was eventually repulsed and, in a running battle, the flotilla was harassed by Soviet aircraft, gunboats, as well as motor torpedo, patrol and armored boats, all the way back to its base along the northern shore of Lake Ladoga. When approaching Sukho Island, one light ferry (SF 12) ran aground and several other ferries went to assist it. However one of the light ferries (SF 22) was hit by Soviet coastal artillery fire and one heavy (SF 13) and one light ferry (SF 26) that had gone to assist the grounded ferry SF 12 also became grounded despite the efforts to get them loose. Ultimately, all three had to be abandoned. During the return voyage one heavy ferry (SF 21) had to be abandoned when it started to take on water so badly that it would not have made it back to the base. An infantry boat (I 6) towed by the ferry was also lost. Losses suffered by the EFO during the raid were heavy. The heavy artillery ferries SF 13 (grounded) and SF 21 (damaged, later scuttled), the light artillery ferries SF 12 (grounded) and SF 26 (grounded) and the infantry boat I 6—casualties for the naval and landing forces were 18 men dead, 57 wounded (one of them fatally), and 4 missing. One of the lost light ferries and the infantry boat I 6 were captured by Soviet forces.

== Analysis ==
The operations of the international flotilla were a failure. The Siebel ferries of EFO had good armament but they were far too slow and had too short a range for effective operations. They were almost "sitting ducks" to the Soviet patrol boats, gunboats and bombers. As their personnel came from the Luftwaffe, with no sea-going experience, operations in the often harsh weather conditions were extremely difficult.

== See also ==
- XII Squadriglia MAS
