= Battle of Sukho Island =

Naval engagement between the Soviet Navy and German Luftwaffe during World War II

- Part of the Eastern Front of World War II
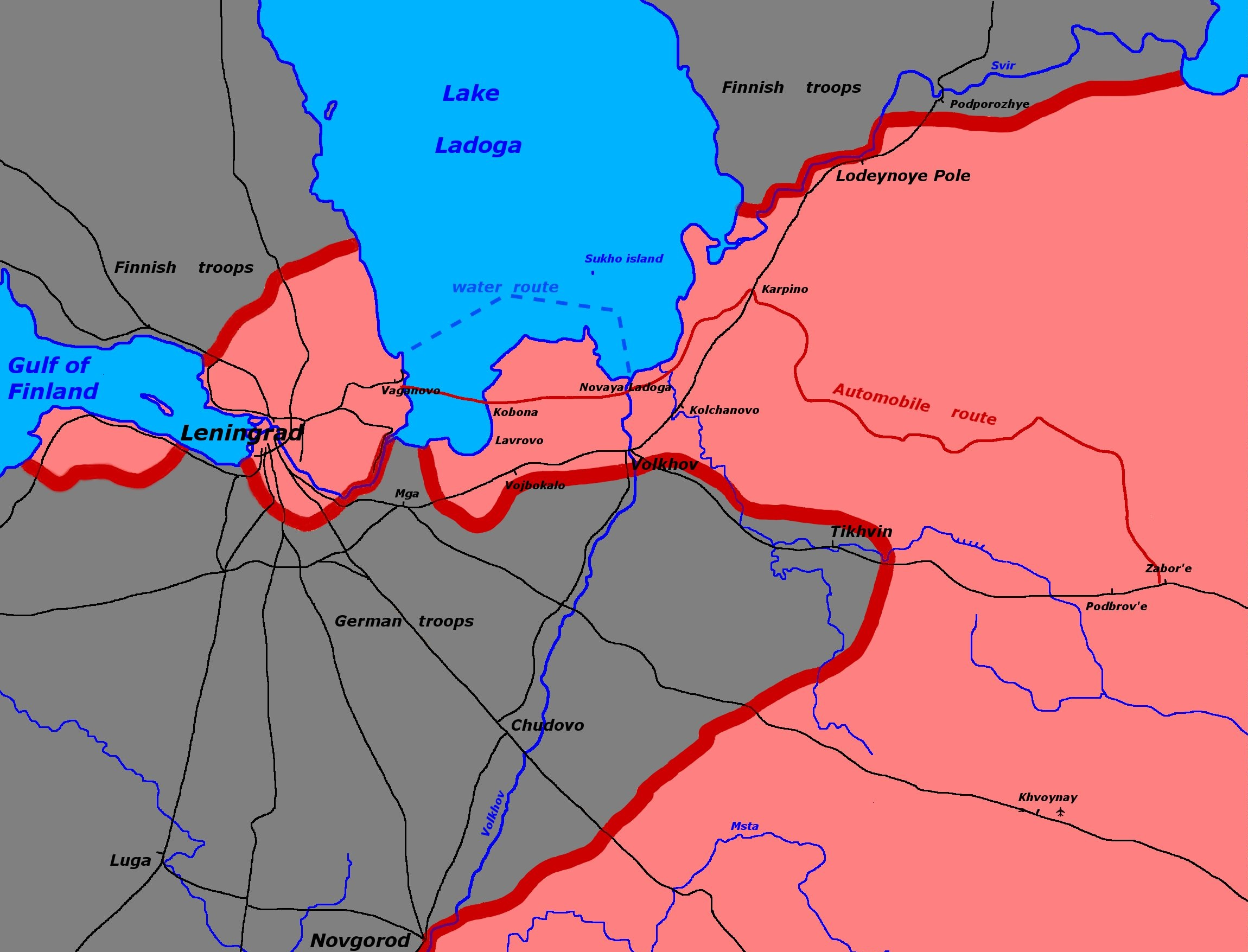
- Map showing the Axis occupation of Leningrad Oblast by the end of 1941, including Sukho Island on Lake Ladoga
Date	22 October 1942
Location	Sukho Island, Lake Ladoga
Result	Soviet victory

Belligerents
Germany; Italy; Finland	Soviet Union

Commanders and leaders
Friedrich Siebel; Max Wachtel	Viktor Cherokov; Nikolai Ozarovsky; Pyotr Kuriat; Ivan Gusev; Pyotr Kargin; Vladimir Kovalevsky

Strength
Landing forces: 11 combat ferries; 3 transport ferries; 7 infantry boats; 70 troops (landing party); 1 HQ ferry; 1 hospital ferry; Screening force: 3 MAS boats	Anti-landing forces: 3 × 100 mm (3.9 in) coastal guns; 1 × 12.7 mm, 1 × 7.62 mm, and 1 × quadruple 7.62 mm AA machine guns; c. 90 – c. 100 troops; 1 minesweeper; 1 patrol boat; Pursuing forces: 3 gunboats; 3 minesweepers; 5 patrol boats; 2 armoured motor gunboats; 2 motor torpedo boats

Casualties and losses
4 combat ferries and 1 infantry boat lost; Unknown number of aircraft; 18 KIA, 57 WIA, 4 MIA	1 gunboat and 1 patrol boat damaged; 2 × 100 mm coastal guns and 2 × AA machine guns destroyed; 1 × AA machine gun damaged; 6 aircraft lost (4 Il-2s, 2 I-15bises); 6 KIA, 23 WIA, 6 POWs

The Battle of Sukho Island, also known as Operation Brazil (German: Brasil), was an amphibious operation and naval engagement on Lake Ladoga between the Soviet Navy and a German Luftwaffe naval detachment during World War II.

== Background ==
During the siege of Leningrad the Soviets moved supplies to the city through Lake Ladoga. The Axis deployed the Finnish Ladoga Naval Detachment, Naval Detachment K (including the Italian XII Squadriglia MAS), and the German Luftwaffe Einsatzstab Fähre Ost, to interdict the route; the Italian unit conducted MAS attacks. The combined Axis force failed to significantly interrupt traffic.

The culmination of Axis operations was the raid against Sukho Island, c. 20 km (12 mi; 11 nmi) from the southern shore of the lake, which covered supply lines and the approaches to Soviet bases.

== Axis forces ==
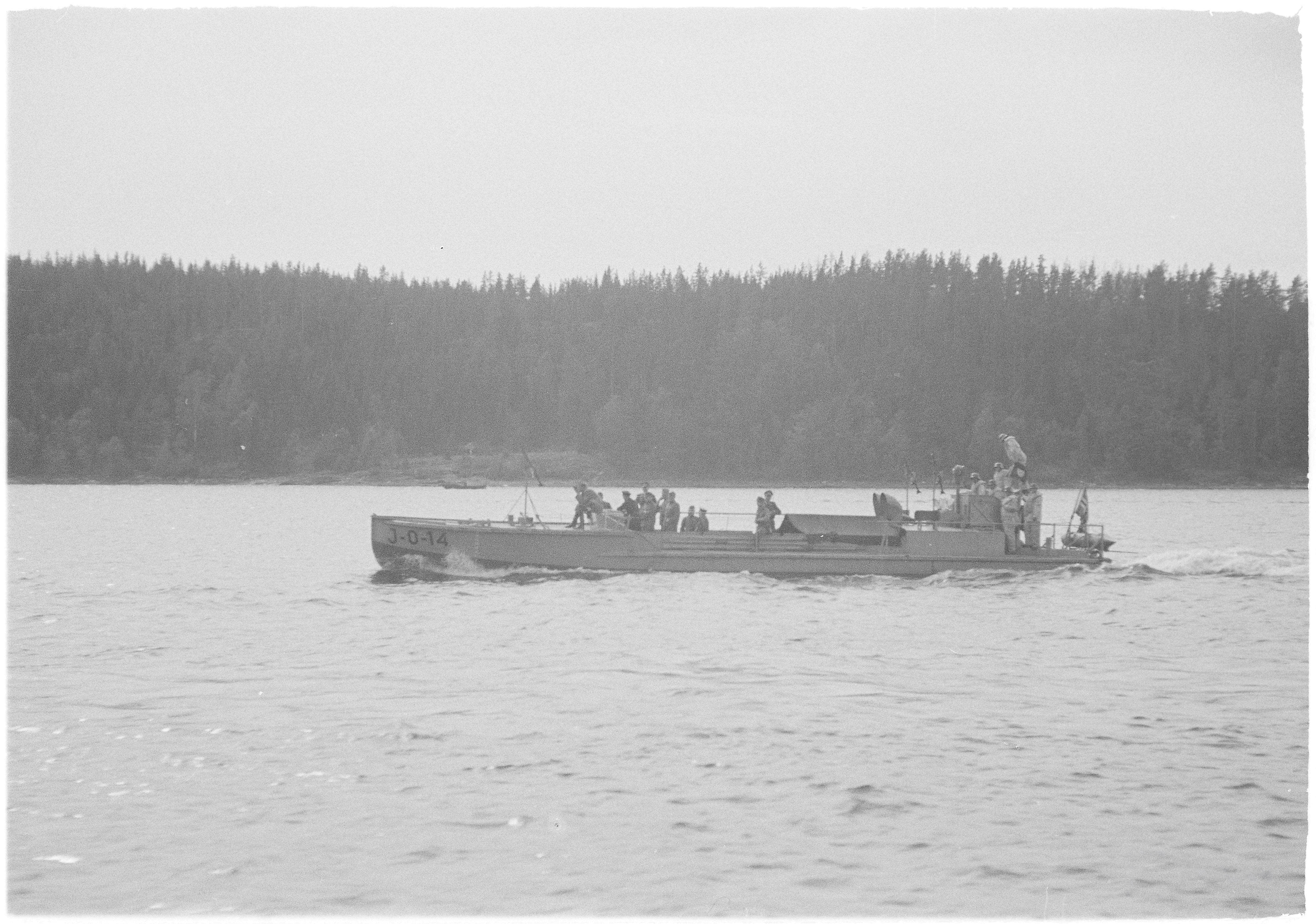
A German infantry boat (I-boat) underway during the Axis naval review at Lakhdenpokhya on Lake Ladoga, 13 August 1942

The attack was commanded by Oberstleutnant Max Wachtel. The flotilla was composed of 16 Siebel ferries, seven infantry boats (German: Infanterietransporter „Siebelgefäß“, lit. 'Siebel Vessel infantry transporter', also known as I-Boot, 'I-boat'), and three Italian MAS boats (two of which escorted the landing force to Sukho Island and subsequently returned to base).

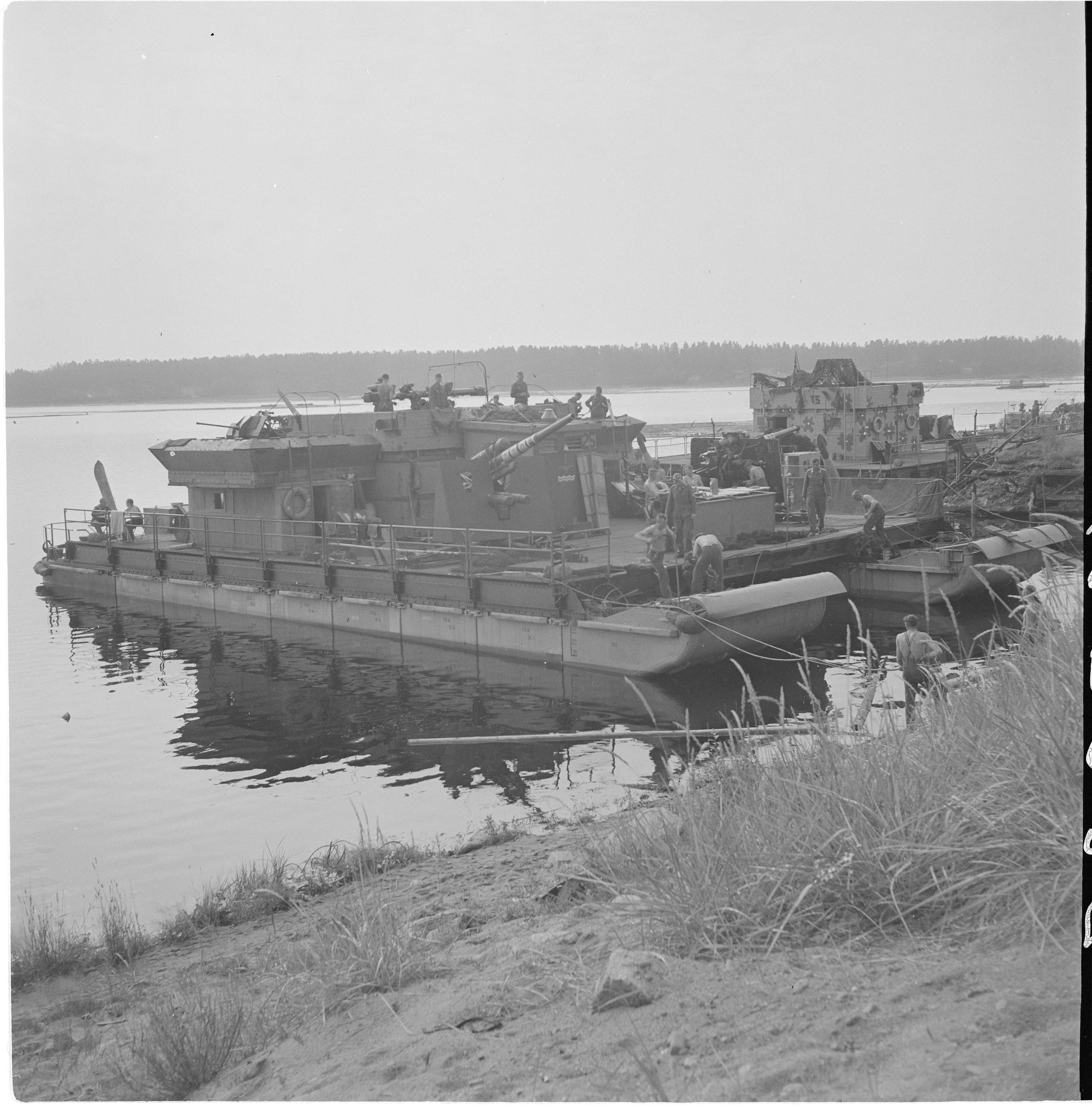
The German heavy anti-aircraft combat Siebel ferry SF 25 (foreground) and the transport Siebel ferry T 5 (background) are at Käkisalmi on Lake Ladoga, 25 August 1942

Seven combat ferries (SF 11, SF 13, SF 15, SF 17, SF 21, SF 23, SF 25) were fitted with heavy anti-aircraft weapons. Four combat ferries (SF 12, SF 14, SF 22, SF 26) were fitted with light anti-aircraft weapons. A 70-troop landing party was carried aboard three transport ferries (T 2, T 4, T 6), and allocated five of the I-boats. There was also one HQ ferry and one hospital ferry.

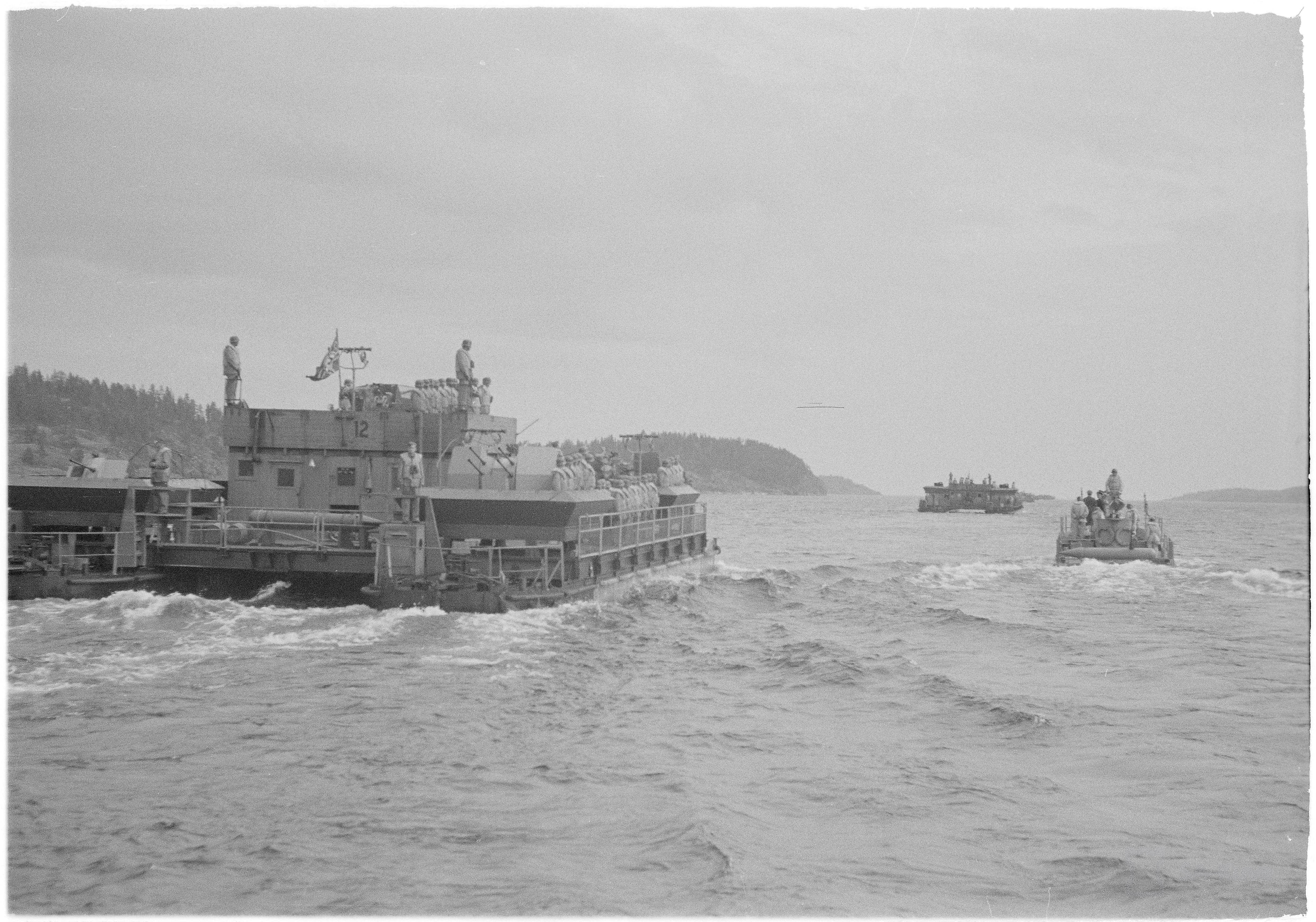
Stern views of the German light anti-aircraft combat Siebel ferry SF 12 (left) and of an I-boat (right) underway during the Axis naval review at Lakhdenpokhya on Lake Ladoga, 13 August 1942

German and Finnish fighter aircraft provided air cover for the landing force during the battle.

== Soviet forces ==
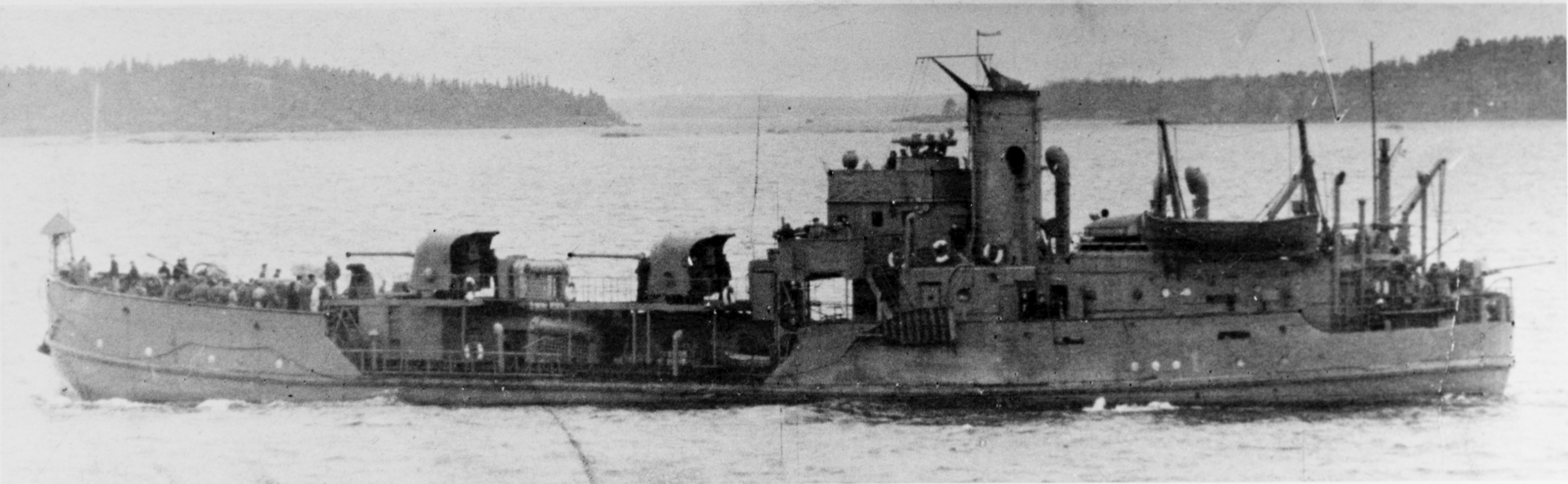
A Soviet Moskva-class gunboat underway in the Baltic Sea, 1944; (Note: Until 1943, the armament of the Moskva-class gunboats Bira, Selemdzha, and Nora consisted of two 100 mm (3.9 in)/56-caliber B-24BM naval guns (for Bira and Selemdzha) or four 76.2 mm (3 in)/55-caliber 34-K anti-aircraft guns (for Nora), four 45 mm (1.8 in)/46-caliber 21-K anti-aircraft guns, and one 12.7 mm DShK machine gun.) this ship class consisted of 11 German-built (1940–1941) self-propelled hopper barges that were converted for naval service

Garrison of Sukho

- Three 100 mm (3.9 in)/56-caliber B-24BM coastal guns, one 12.7 mm DShK anti-aircraft (AA) machine gun, one 7.62 mm PM M1910 AA machine gun, one quadruple 7.62 mm M-4 AA machine gun mount, c. 90 – c. 100 troops (Note: According to some sources, the Soviet garrison of Sukho also included c. 30 – c. 40 soldiers from a Soviet Ladoga Flotilla construction battalion, who were building fortifications on the island at that time.) under the command of Senior Lieutenant Ivan Gusev.

Screening force off Sukho

- The minesweeper TShch-100 (formerly the Finnish gunboat Aunus from 1919 to 1940, originally a 1900-built icebreaking river tug commissioned into naval service) commanded by Senior Lieutenant Pyotr Kargin, and the MO-class patrol boat MO-171 under the command of Senior Lieutenant Vladimir Kovalevsky.

These Soviet warships patrolled the waterway area near Sukho Island on the night of October 21–22, 1942, and participated in the battle during the Axis landing.

Pursuing force from Naval Base Morye

- The Moskva-class gunboats Bira and Selemdzha, and the G-5-class motor torpedo boats TKA-61 and TKA-81 (towed by the gunboats), under the command of Captain 1st Rank Nikolai Ozarovsky.
  - The MO-class patrol boats MO-198 and MO-214, and the Type 1124BKA armoured motor gunboats BK-99 and BK-100, commanded by Senior Lieutenant Nikolai Yepikhin.

These Soviet naval forces departed from Morye sometime after receiving a radio message from TShch-100 about the Axis landing on Sukho Island and went on to participate in the battle during the pursuit phase.

Pursuing force from Naval Base Novaya Ladoga

- The Moskva-class gunboat Nora, the Izhorets-class minesweepers TShch-37, (Note: According to some sources, TShch-37 was not part of the Izhorets class. Possibly, it was the minesweeper Boyevoy (ex–No. 37), a former 1911-built river steam tug of the North-Western River Shipping Company commissioned into naval service.) TShch-126, and TShch-127, and the MO-class patrol boats MO-201, MO-205, and MO-206, under the command of Captain 3rd Rank Pyotr Kuriat.

This Soviet naval detachment departed from Novaya Ladoga sometime after receiving a radio message from TShch-100 about the Axis landing on Sukho Island. According to some sources, the force arrived too late to intercept the enemy and join the battle.

== Battle ==
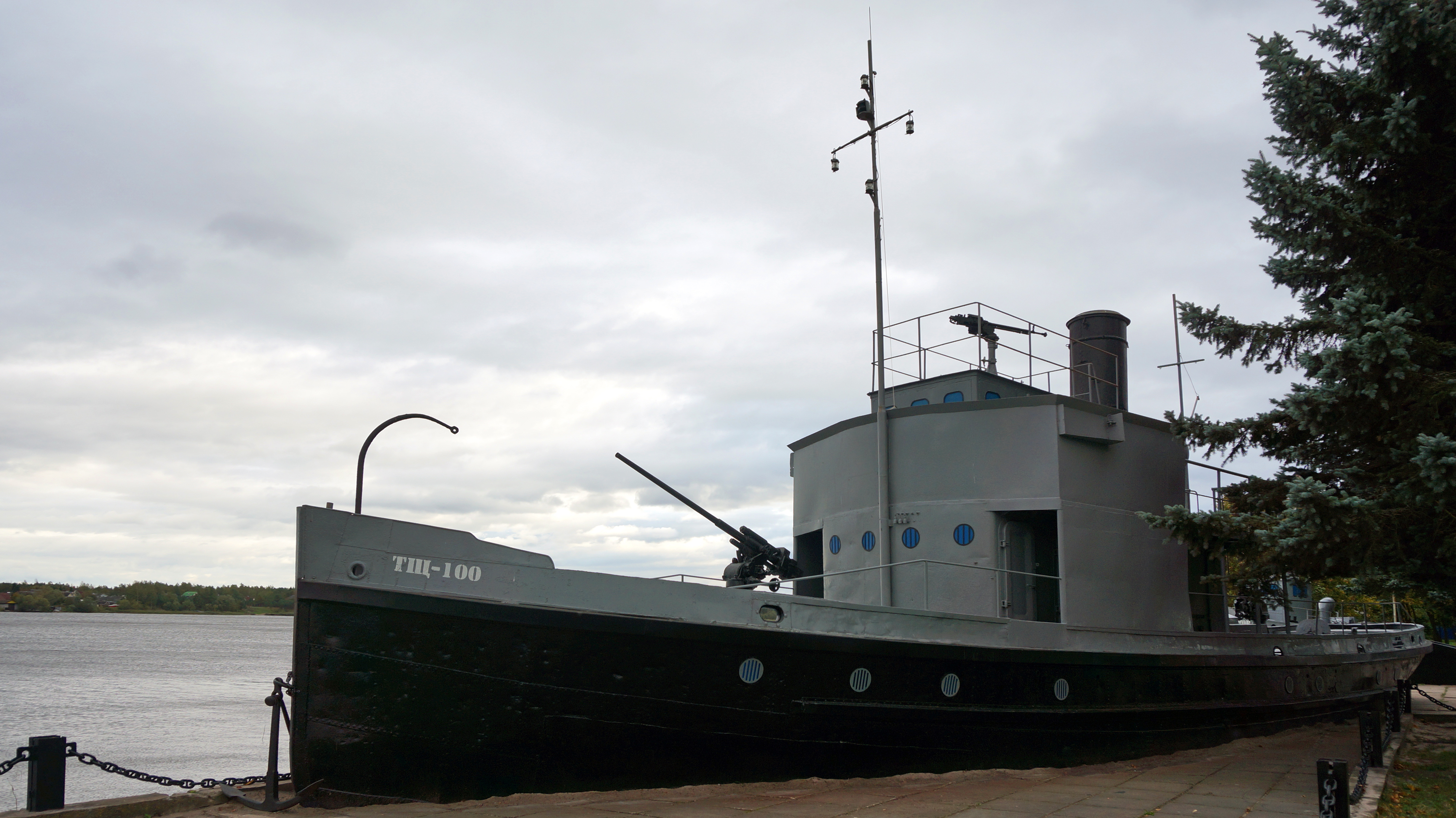
The former Soviet minesweeper TShch-100 (Russian: ТЩ-100), a memorial ship in Novaya Ladoga, 2018

The German ferries were escorted at a distance by an Italian MAS boat (MAS 526 or MAS 528 according to various sources); crucially, surprise was lost when they were detected by the Soviet minesweeper TShch-100 which joined the battle together with the patrol boat MO-171 entering the fight later. Prior to the landing, nine German Junkers Ju 88 As from KG 1 unsuccessfully bombed the island (according to some sources, there were only two Junkers Ju 88s). The Axis landing party landed on Sukho under the cover of the combat ferries; two of the three Soviet 100 mm coastal guns, as well as two anti-aircraft machine guns, were destroyed, another anti-aircraft machine gun was damaged; and the lighthouse was also damaged but not taken. The landing party withdrew after sustaining casualties, losing radio contact due to waterlogged equipment, and receiving a flare signal to retreat.

On the lake, multiple German ferries grounded around the island. SF 12 grounded on rocks, followed by SF 13 while attempting to assist. SF 22 grounded after being disabled by the remaining Soviet 100 mm coastal gun; SF 14 and SF 26 grounded attempting to assist. A Soviet patrol boat was damaged and retreated under a smoke screen. The arrival of the main forces of the Soviet Ladoga Flotilla forced the Axis to withdraw after having refloated SF 14 and SF 22.

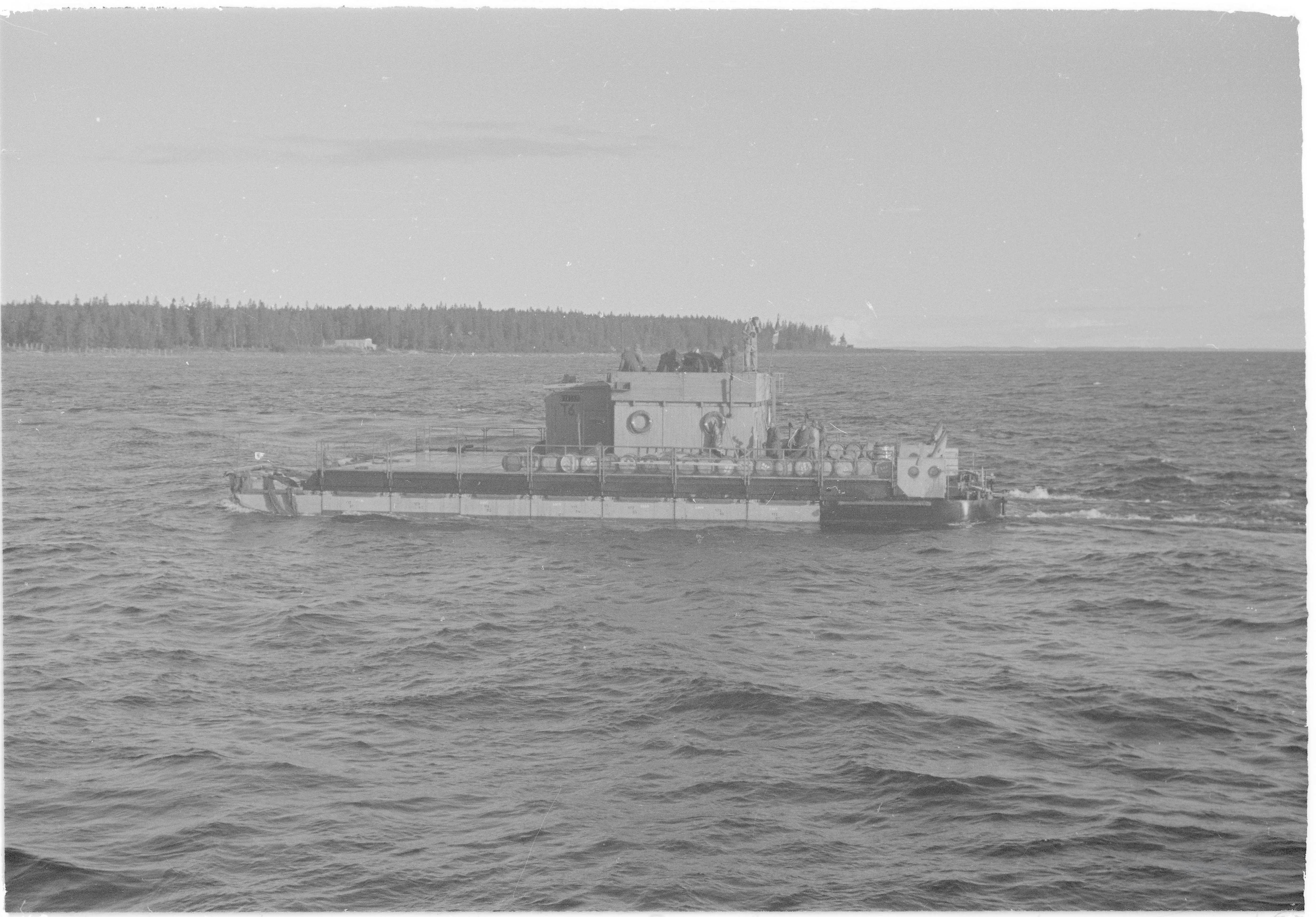
The German transport Siebel ferry T 6 underway on Lake Ladoga, 31 August 1942

Soviet naval and air forces pursued but inflicted only minor damage on the retreating Germans; attacks by the Soviet G-5-class motor torpedo boats TKA-61 and TKA-81 on rear-guard transport ferries scored no hits, while the Germans claimed four hits on a Soviet ship. The German retreat was slowed by ferries suffering machinery failure. SF 21 was used as a rearguard; it silenced the remaining gun on Sukho but was damaged and then abandoned – along with the towed infantry boat I 6 – when it began to sink from leaks and pump failures, after which it was set on fire by gunfire from the ferries SF 11 and SF 23.

== Aftermath ==
The Axis suffered heavy casualties for little result, and marked the effective end of offensive Axis operations on Lake Ladoga. Seventeen of the 23 participating German ships were sunk or seriously damaged; four combat ferries (SF 12, SF 13, SF 21, SF 26) and one I-boat (I 6, which was captured by Soviet forces) were lost, and SF 22 was heavily damaged (one of the light anti-aircraft combat Siebel ferries that ran aground near Sukho Island was captured by Soviet forces, repaired, and subsequently commissioned into the Soviet Navy as DB-51). Crew and troop casualties amounted to 18 killed, 57 wounded (one of them fatally) and four missing.

Total Soviet losses are six killed (or seven killed according to some sources) and 23 wounded (according to some sources, two of them fatally). Beyond naval losses, the Germans took six prisoners from Sukho.

== See also ==
- Road of Life
