= Finnish Ladoga Naval Detachment =

Military unit (1920–1940; 1941-1944)

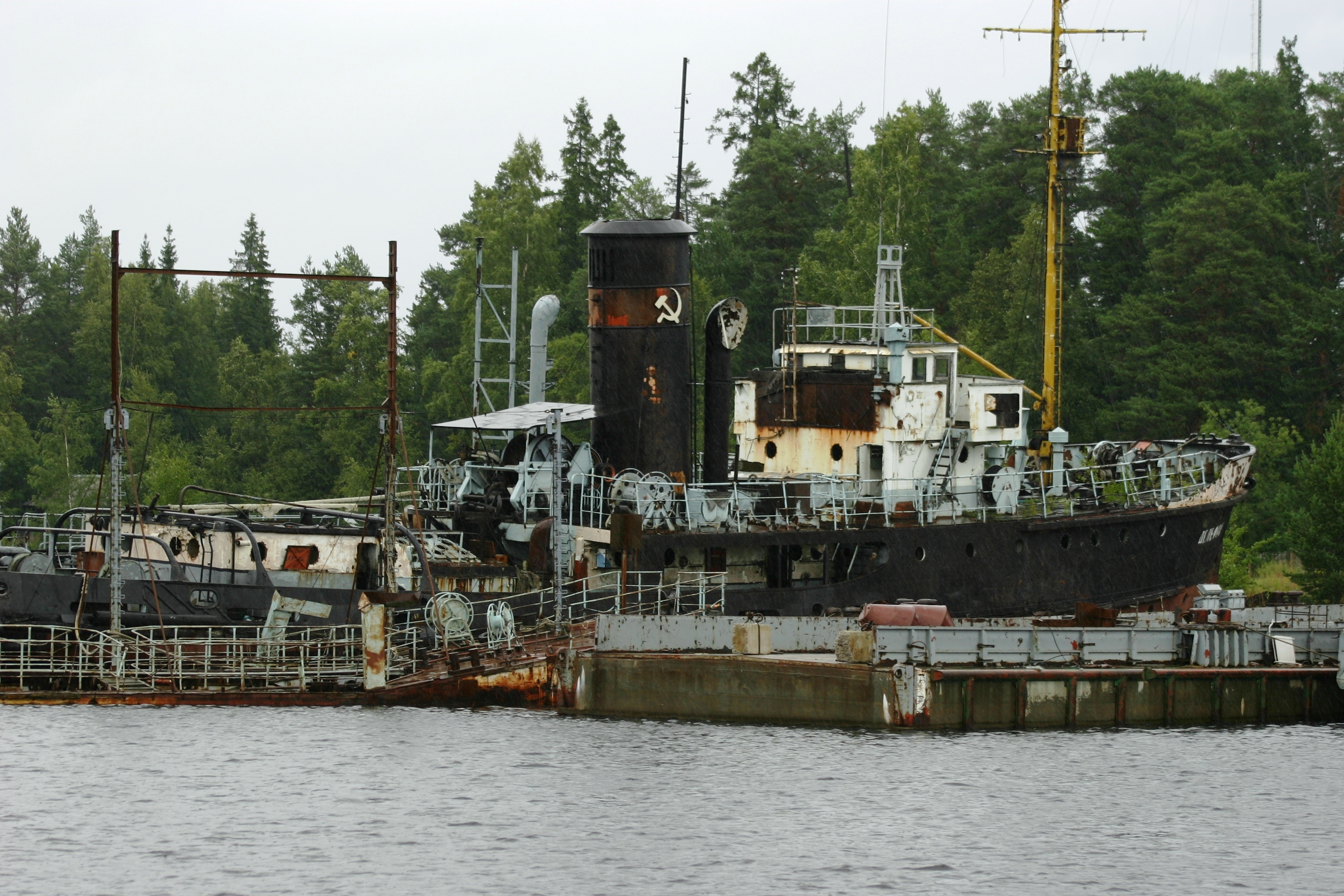
Former Finnish Ladoga Navy ship, the scavenger Kiviniemi, among other ships awaiting scrapping in Sortanlahti Bay, Ladoga, 2008.

Finnish Ladoga Naval Detachment (Finnish: Laatokan laivasto-osasto) was a Finnish naval unit stationed on Lake Ladoga between 1920–1940 and 1941–1944.

== Background ==
The Treaty of Tartu was signed by the Russians and the Finns in 1920. It included terms which limited the size of naval vessels on Ladoga to 100 tons, and the calibre of their armament to a maximum of 47 mm. When the Finns embarked on their naval rebuilding program in the early 1930s, some vessels were purposely designed to fit this 100 t limitation, including a small submarine. The Finns, however, found more use for their few vessels in the Baltic Sea, and therefore had only a few small patrol boats on the lake. As the clouds of war began to draw closer the Finns had to improvise.

== Winter War ==
The Winter War began on 30 November 1939 when the Soviet Union attacked Finland, nullifying the Treaty of Tartu. The Finns hastily gathered a small flotilla, consisting of the icebreaker Aallokas, the improvised gunboats Aunus, Vulcan and Tarmo, as well as Hercules, Kiviniemi, Yrjö, Voima, S I, N K af Klecker and a number of transport vessels to protect its sea front and islands. The largest ship among this group was the icebreaker Aallokas, whose commander Captain-Lieutenant Asikainen also commanded the gunboats. There were no major naval battles in the open waters of Lake Ladoga during 1939 - 1940, so the fleet units were tasked with fire support against the attacking Red Army, and spreading mines along the coastal areas. By January 1940 the ice became so thick that only Aallokas could be used, and she was damaged in an attack by Soviet aircraft on February 2. After the peace on March 13 the Finnish vessels had to be left at Ladoga, which had become a Soviet lake. Some of the vessels were later integrated into the Soviet Ladoga flotilla.

=== Vessels ===
Listing (not necessarily exhaustive) of wartime vessels and their armament

| Name | Type | Role | Built | Size | Armament |
|---|---|---|---|---|---|
| Aallokas | Icebreaker | Gunboat | 1936 | 300 tons | 2 × 75 mm guns |
| Tarmo (formerly: Syd) | Requisitioned Tug | Gunboat | 1911 | 89 tons | 1 × 75 mm gun |
| Vulcan | Requisitioned Tug | Gunboat | 1901 | 75 tons | 1 × 75 mm gun |
| Aunus | Tug (captured 1919) | Gunboat | ~ 1900 | 95 tons | 2 × 47 mm guns; 20 mines |
| Vapaus | Requisitioned Tug | Gunboat | 1913 | 89 tons | 2 × 47 mm guns |
| Yrjö | Transport | Minelayer | ~ 1910 | 90 tons | 1 × 47 mm gun; 40 mines |
| Voima (formerly Orion) | Requisitioned Tug | Minelayer | 1895 | 66 tons | 1 × 47 mm gun; mines |
| S I | Motor boat | Minesweeper | ? | 27 tons | 1 × 47 mm gun |
| N.K. af Klercker | Motor boat | Minesweeper | ? | 29 tons | 1 × 47 mm gun |

== Continuation War ==
When Finnish forces in the Continuation War reached lake Ladoga in 1941, they found the Soviets had evacuated nearly every serviceable vessel to the southern shore of the lake. On 22 September 1941 the Finns captured a Soviet transport vessel (formerly Latvian coastal transport Ilga) which was pressed into service as the transport vessel Aunus. Other vessels available were small armed fishing boats, like 15 ton Kukkapää.

Initial Finnish naval assets consisted of small motor boats which had been small enough to be transported from Finland overland. These were used already on 16-17 August 1941 to mount a landing operation on Markatsiman (ru: Ostrov Markatsiman-Sari) island which was lightly defended and fell quickly. The next notable action was the Finnish landing operation on Rahmansaari island on 7-10 September. While the initial landing operation was successful the strong Soviet naval response and Soviet reinforcements which managed to reach the island prolonged the operation. Finnish artillery managed to prevent further Soviet naval support to the land forces which led to surrender of the remaining 130 Soviet soldiers on 10 September. The Finns had intended to mount further landing operations to secure the island of Valamo but the Soviets withdrew from there as well as from most of the other islands on the lake voluntarily. Finnish forces took control of the island of Valamo on 20 September and the island of Konevitsa on 25 September.

Since Soviet forces remained inactive on lake Ladoga for the rest of 1941 Finnish naval forces concentrated on security and transport duties. After the Finns had captured maps of the Soviet naval minefields on the lake several boats were detailed for minesweeping duties which yielded no results nor losses. In the spring of 1942 the Finnish commander made recommendations to German leadership past Finnish HQs leading to the formation of Naval Detachment K, which included adding the Finnish motor torpedo boat Sisu to the lake. They were also joined in the summer of 1942 by a German unit, the Einsatzstab Fähre Ost (EFO), of armed Siebel ferries. Operations of the Naval Detachment K or EFO had very limited success.

When Germany decided to withdraw its naval assets from Ladoga in late 1942, the Finns bought two of the Siebel ferries, T-2 and T-17. Later, when the Soviets' 1944 offensive against the Finns began, Germany transferred four MAL-type ferries - M-31, M-32, M-33 and M-34 - originally intended for use on Lake Peipus, to the Finns on Ladoga. The Finnish Navy also transferred several small run-down naval vessels to the lake, the motor torpedo boats Syöksy, and Vinha, which were no longer in adequate condition to carry torpedoes.

The lake remained mostly quiet until the Soviet offensive of 1944 started. While Finnish naval forces on the lake remained passive during the Soviet landings at Tuloksa on 23 June they did play a key role in facilitating the Finnish evacuations from the eastern shore of lake Ladoga. After the evacuations the light naval assets successfully protected the flank of the land front and repulsed Soviet attempts to penetrate to the northern part of lake Ladoga until mid July when Soviet naval activity on the lake started to decrease. The majority of the ships and boats used by the Finns were evacuated overland to Finland after the Moscow Armistice.

=== Vessels ===
Listing (not necessarily exhaustive) of wartime vessels and their armament

| Name | Type | Role | In Finnish use | Built | Size | Armament |
|---|---|---|---|---|---|---|
| Aunus (formerly: Ilga) | Transport (captured 1941) | Transport | 1941–1944 | ~ 1925 | 211 tons | 1 × 47 mm gun; 2 × 20 mm guns |
| Kukkapää | Fishing boat | Patrol boat | 1941–1944 | ~ 1930 | 15 tons | 1 × 47 mm gun |
| T-class ferry (Siebel ferry) T-2 T-17 | Gunferry | Gunferry | 1942–1944 | ~ 1940 | 143 tons | 2 × 102 mm guns; 2 × 20 mm guns |
| M-class ferry (MAL-ferry) M-31 M-32 M-33 M-34 | Gunferry | Gunferry | 1944 | ~ 1941 | 180 tons | 2 × 88 mm guns; 1 × 37 mm gun; 1 × 20 mm gun; depth charges |
| I-boat (Infanterie-boat) VMV 101 VMV 102 VMV 103 VMV 104 | Infantry boat | Patrol boat | 1942–1944 | ? | 10 tons | 1 × 57 mm gun; 1 × 20 mm gun |
| Sisu | Motor torpedo boat | Patrol boat | 1942–1944 | 1916 | 13 tons | 1 × machine gun |
| Syöksy-class Syöksy Vinha Nuoli | Motor torpedo boat | Patrol boat | 1944 | 1928 | 13 tons | 1 × 20 mm gun; 3 mines |

== See also ==
- Italian Ladoga Naval Division
- German Ladoga Flottila
