= Naval Detachment K =

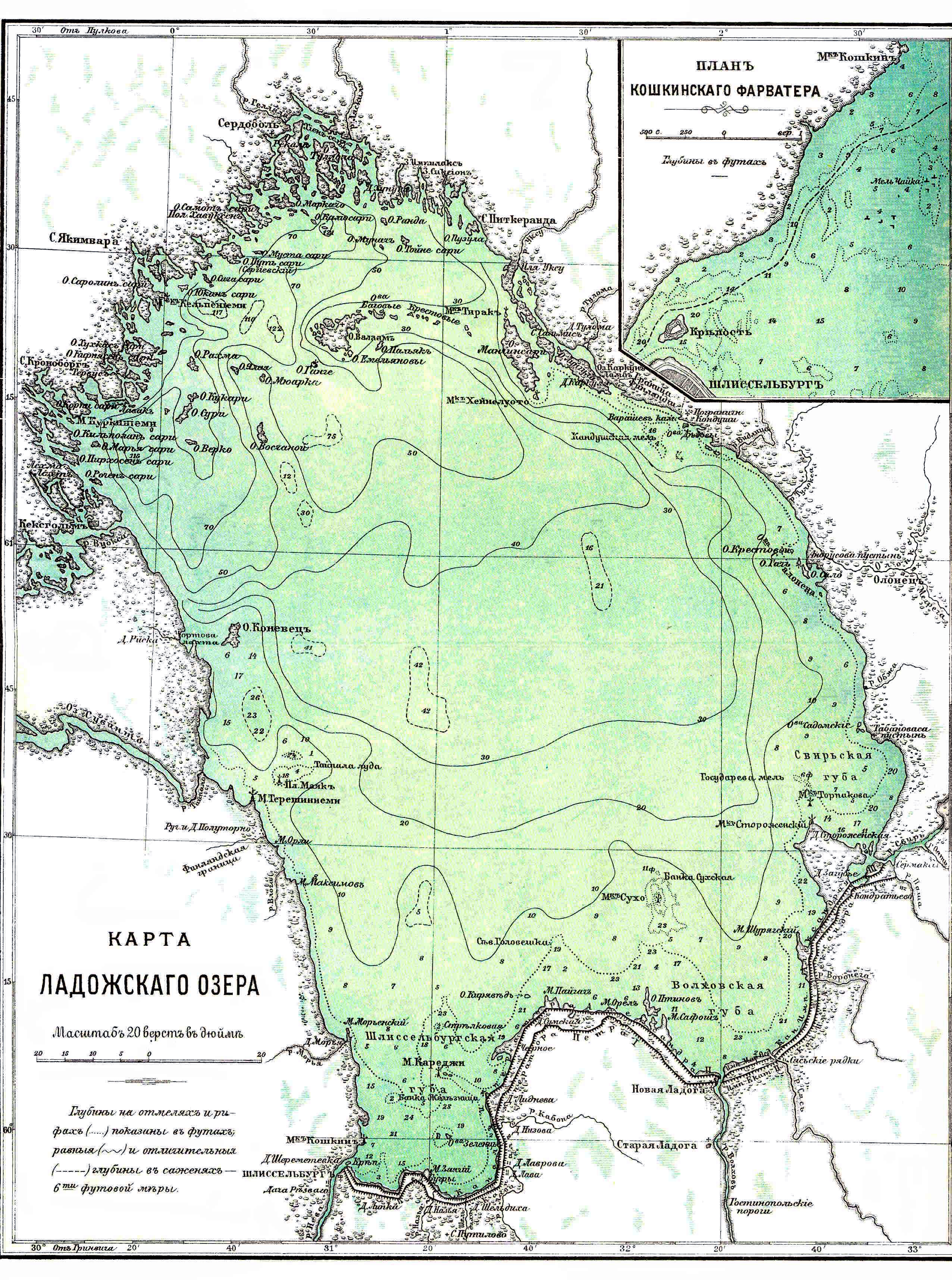
Map of Lake Ladoga (in pre-reform Russian orthography), as illustrated in the Brockhaus and Efron Encyclopedic Dictionary (vol. XVII, 1896)

Naval Detachment K (Finnish: Laivasto-osasto K) was a Finnish military detachment, a flotilla that operated on Lake Ladoga during World War II.

== Background ==
The Continuation War began in the summer of 1941. The Finns, who had operated naval units on Lake Ladoga before the Winter War, began reestablishing the Finnish Ladoga Flotilla (Finnish: Laatokan laivasto-osasto) on the lake as soon as their troops reached its shores early on in the war. The headquarters was formed in Läskelä on 2 August 1941 and by 6 August, 150 motorboats, two tugs (used as minelayers) and four steam ferries had been transferred there. The tugs and ferries were equipped with 47 mm guns and machine guns. The Finns also established a number of coastal batteries on the shores and islands of Lake Ladoga. The only "true" Finnish warship on Lake Ladoga at that time was the obsolete motor torpedo boat Sisu. As the Finnish land forces advanced, new headquarters were established in the captured towns along the shores of Ladoga. The Ladoga flotilla's headquarters was eventually moved to Sortavala and the harbour at Lakhdenpokhya became its primary base of operations.

== Formation ==
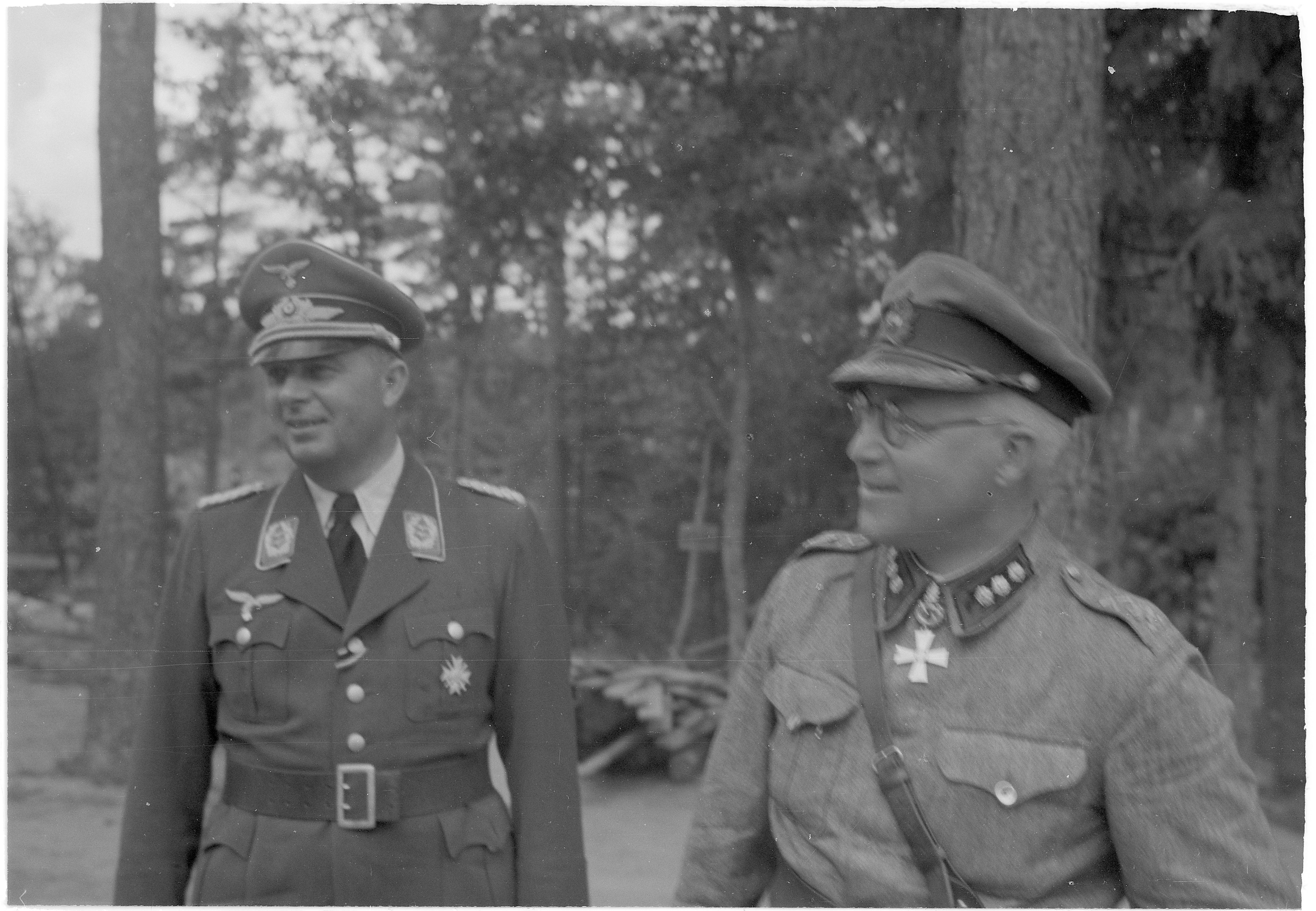
The German EFO Commander, Oberstleutnant Friedrich Siebel (left), and the Finnish Ladoga Coastal Defense Brigade Commander, Eversti Eino Järvinen, in Lakhdenpokhya on July 3, 1942

Already during the spring Finnish Kenraaliluutnantti Paavo Talvela and Eversti Eino Iisakki Järvinen who was commanding the Ladoga Coastal Defense Brigade (Finnish: Laatokan rannikkoprikaati) came up with an idea that the boat traffic providing supplies to the Leningrad needed to be disrupted. Talvela then presented this idea to the Germans on his own behalf going past both Finnish Navy Staff and General Staff. Germans responded positively to the proposition and informed the slightly surprised Finns—who apart from Talvela had very little knowledge of the proposition—that transport of the equipment for the Ladoga operation was already arranged. Both the Germans and Italians sent naval units to Lake Ladoga to assist the Finns with coastal defence of the lake and to enforce the ongoing siege of Leningrad.

A combined Finnish–German–Italian unit, Naval Detachment K was formed on 17 May 1942, consisting of four Italian MAS boats, four Kriegsmarine minelayers (German: Küstenminenboot, lit. 'Coastal Mine Boat', or KM-Boot, 'KM-boat') and the Finnish motor torpedo boat Sisu. The German and Italian vessels were grouped into two units under Finnish command. First to arrive was the Italian XII Squadriglia MAS on 22 June, consisting of four motor torpedo boats (MAS 526, MAS 527, MAS 528 and MAS 529). Five days later, four German KM-boats (KM 3, KM 4, KM 8, and KM 22) also arrived. The German minelaying boats had inexperienced crews and unreliable engines and it took until 10 August before all KM-boats were repaired and deemed operational.

Also operating on the lake were the Finnish Ladoga Flotilla, composed mainly of armed fishing vessels and small motorboats and the German Einsatzstab Fähre Ost (Ferry Operations Staff East) (German: Einsatzstab Fähre Ost, or EFO), a Luftwaffe formation consisting of infantry boats (German: Infanterietransporter „Siebelgefäß", lit. 'Siebel Vessel infantry transporter', a.k.a. I-Boot, 'I-boat') and Siebel ferries.

== Operations ==
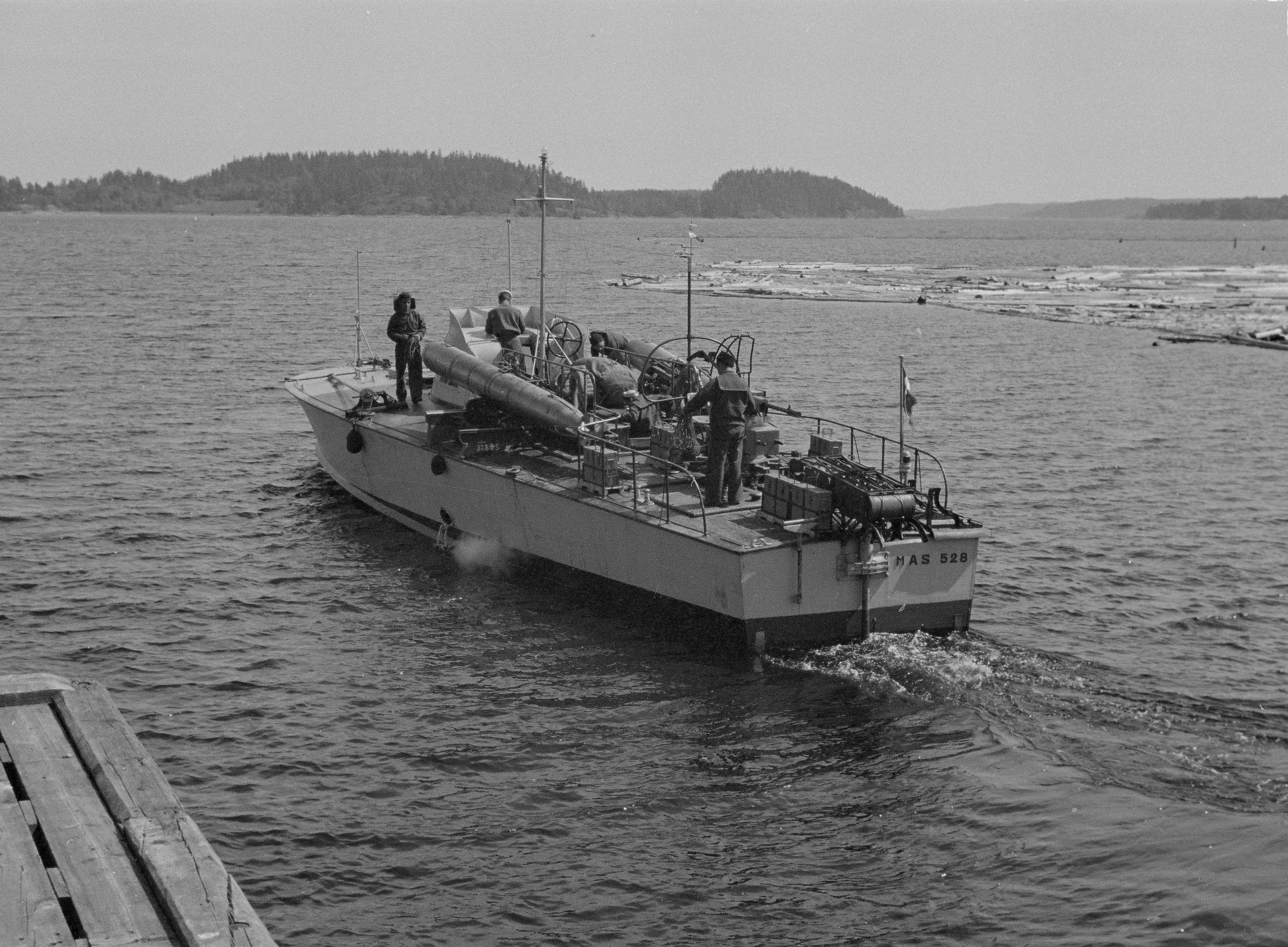
The Italian motor torpedo boat MAS 528 on Lake Ladoga in the summer of 1942, during the siege of Leningrad

Naval Detachment K's primary task was harassing Soviet supply lines to Leningrad on southern Ladoga, where Soviet and Allied food and munitions were transported to Leningrad. The unit also conducted minelaying operations near enemy bases and limited landing operations on the shores of Lake Ladoga. The unit failed to sink any Soviet watercraft during its operation on Lake Ladoga.

EFO also undertook offensive operations on the lake like the Battle of Sukho Island, but this was a failure. The Finnish Ladoga Flotilla also had clashed with the Soviet Ladoga Flotilla and operated in Lake Ladoga from June 25, 1941, through November 4, 1944.

== Analysis ==
The operations of the international flotilla were a failure. Torpedoes proved useless in the shallow waters of southern Lake Ladoga, where they frequently struck the bottom. Nor did their magnetic detonators work well against the wooden hulls of Soviet barges and patrol boats. The secondary armament of Italian motor torpedo boats also proved too light seriously to threaten Soviet gunboats. German KM-boats turned out to have extremely unreliable engines, keeping them docked in port far longer than they spent on operations nor were their influence mines especially useful against mainly wooden hulled Soviet vessels.

== Dissolving the detachment ==
Naval Detachment K was dissolved in the winter of 1942–1943. The Italian MAS boats were moved from Lake Ladoga to Tallinn at the end of October 1942 and were eventually absorbed into the Finnish Navy as Jymy class motor torpedo boats. The Germans withdrew most of their vessels, leaving two Siebel ferries and four I-boats that the Finns had bought. In January 1943, the Soviet Armed Forces launched Operation Iskra, to break the siege. Axis forces were pushed back 80 km (50 mi) and the Road of Life lost its significance. Neither German nor Italian units returned to Lake Ladoga, although smaller Finnish units continued to operate in the lake against the Soviets during 1943 and 1944.

== Bibliography ==
- Meister, Jürg (2005) [1958]. Действия на русских внутренних водных путях [Actions on Russian Inland Waterways]. In Morozov, Miroslav E. (ed.). Восточный фронт — война на море 1941–1945 гг. [The Eastern Front: the War at Sea 1941–1945] (in Russian). Translated by Lipatov, Sergei A. Moscow, RU: Eksmo. ISBN 978-5-699-09910-8. First published in 1958 under the title Der Seekrieg in den osteuropäischen Gewässern, 1941/45
