= Sukho (island) =

Island in Russia

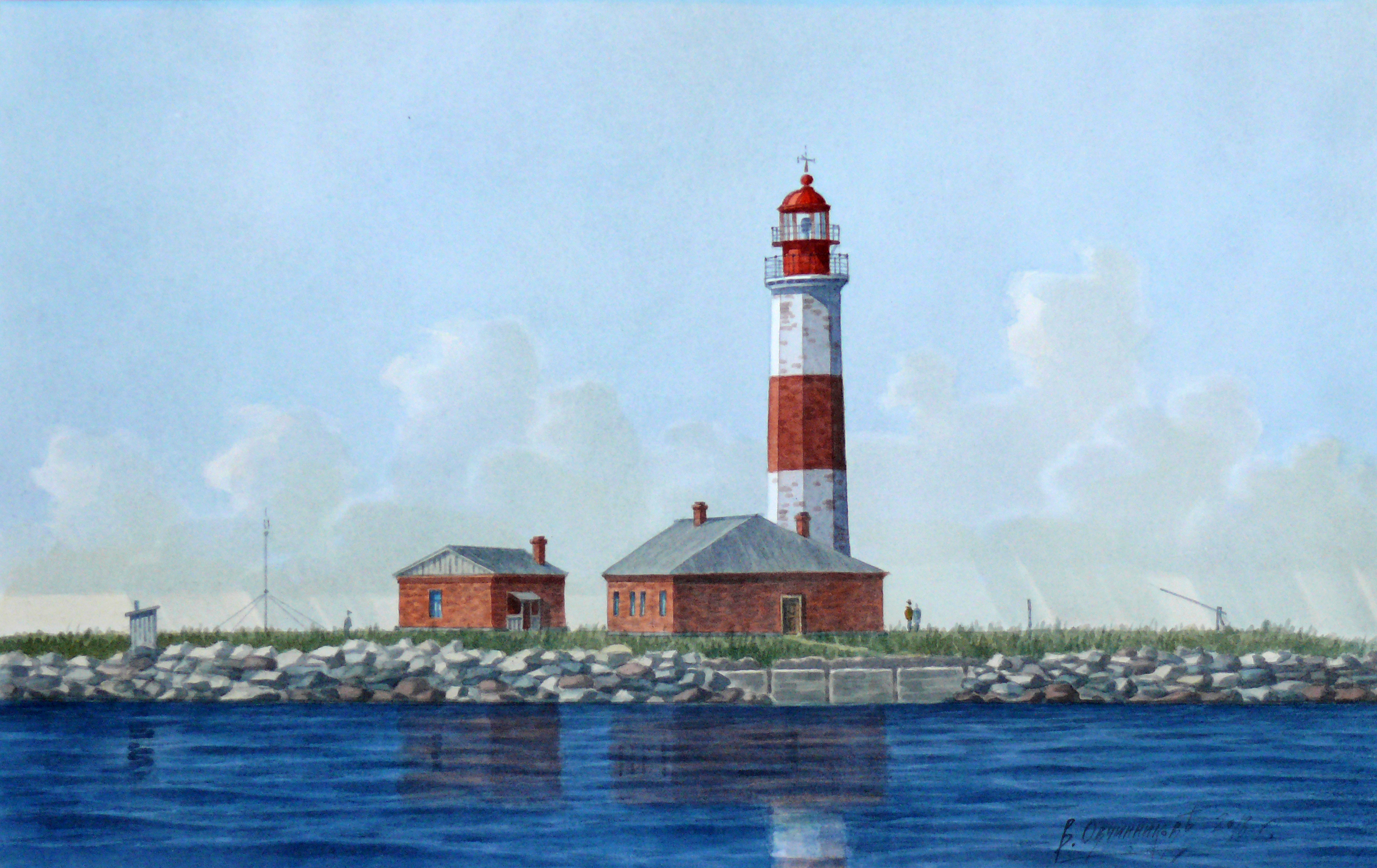
- Painting of the lighthouse by Vyacheslav Ovchinnikov

- Location within Leningrad Oblast

Geography
- Coordinates: 60.408176°N 32.088337°E

Administration
- Russia
- Oblast: Leningrad Oblast
- Volkhovsky District: Volkhovsky District

Sukho (Russian: Сухо) is a small artificial island located in the south-east of Lake Ladoga 20 km near its southern shore. The island has the shape of an irregular horseshoe. Dimensions of this island is approximately 90 to 60 m.

The island was built from a shoal in the early 18th century by order of Tsar Peter I as a navigational aid.

== History ==
According to legend, Peter I discovered the shoal by grounding on it while sailing from Volkhov Bay in a yal, exclaiming: "it's dry here!" ("Zdes sukho"). He ordered all passing vessels to leave stones on the shoal to build the island, which became known as Sukho (Dry). The entrance to the bay was to the south-east because the easterly winds rarely blew there.

A tall stone lighthouse was built in 1891.

During the Second World War, the Soviets garrisoned Sukho to help secure the southern part of the lake. This provided protection for the cross-lake supply routes - such as the Road of Life in the winter - to besieged Leningrad, and covered the approaches to the Soviet Ladoga Flotilla's base at Novaya Ladoga on Volkhov Bay. An Axis amphibious assault on the island in October 1942 using armed Siebel ferries suffered heavy losses to neutralize the Soviet shore battery; it marked the end of effective Axis offensive activity on the lake.

A meteorological station was installed after the war. The island became uninhabited after the dissolution of the Soviet Union. An automated lighthouse remains.
