= XII Squadriglia MAS =

Formation of the Royal Italian Navy

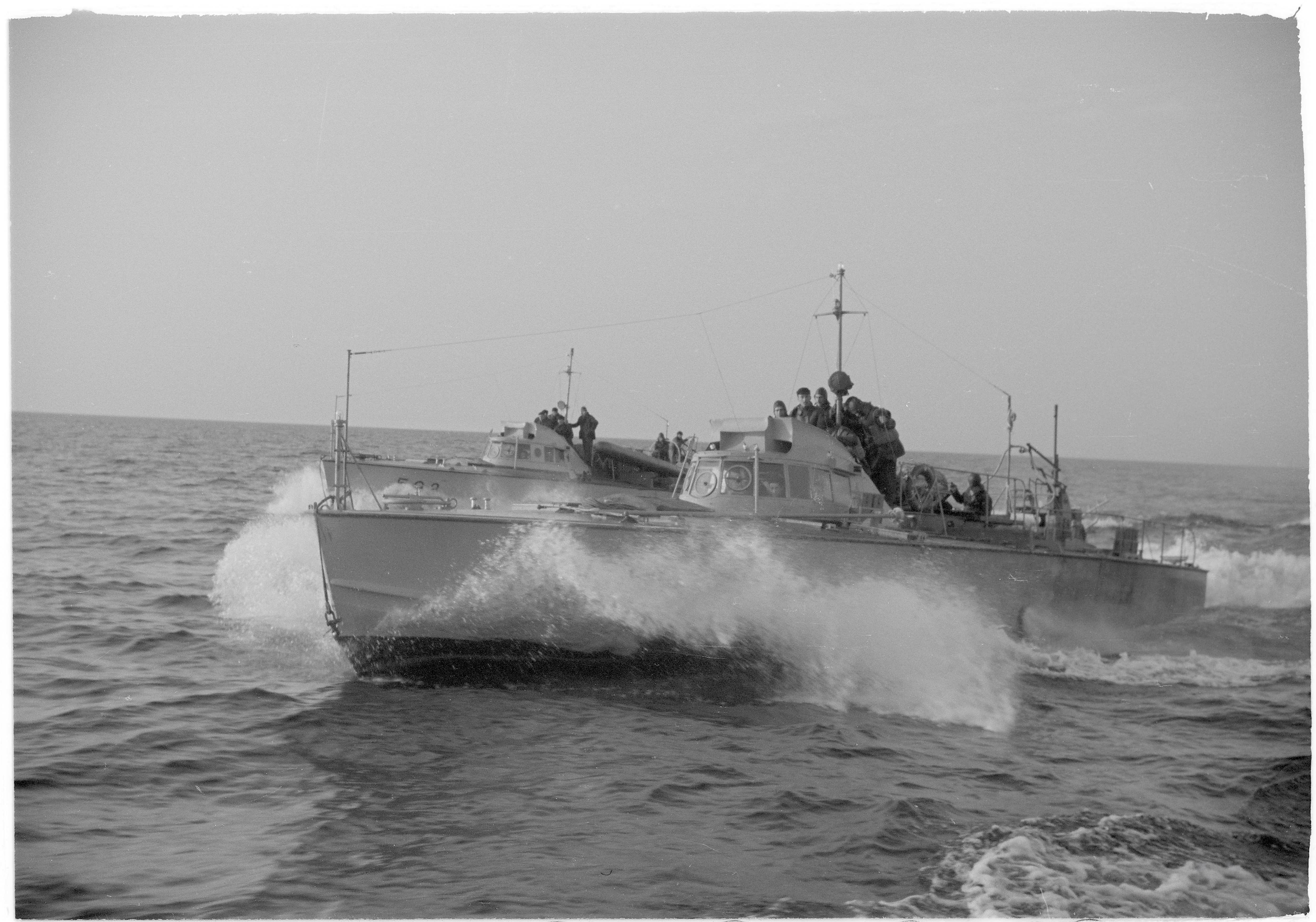
- The Italian motor torpedo boats MAS 527 and MAS 528 on Lake Ladoga in the autumn of 1942, during the siege of Leningrad
- Active: 1942–1943
- Country: Italy
- Branch: Regia Marina
- Type: Division (Italian: squadriglia)
- Role: Anti-submarine warfare Commerce raiding Direct fire Fire support Maritime patrol Raiding; Underwater warfare
- Size: 4 motor torpedo boats
- Part of: Naval Detachment K
- Home port: Sortanlahti
- Equipment: MAS boats
- Engagements: Siege of Leningrad

Commanders
- Capitano di Corvetta: Giuseppe Bianchini

The XII Squadriglia MAS (lit. '12th Assault Craft Division'; Italian: MAS, an initialism for Mezzi d'Assalto) was a formation of the Royal Italian Navy (Regia Marina) which served on Lake Ladoga as part of the Axis siege of Leningrad during World War II.

== Background ==
On 22 June 1941 the Axis, led by Nazi Germany, launched Operation Barbarossa, the invasion of the Soviet Union. During the summer of 1941 the Germans and their allies advanced into the USSR on three broad fronts, towards Leningrad, Murmansk and East Karelia in the north, Moscow in the centre, and Kiev in the south.

Map showing the Axis encirclement of Leningrad

By August 1941 the German Army Group North was on the outskirts of Leningrad, having occupied the Baltic states and the southwestern part of Leningrad Oblast, and captured the southern coasts of Lake Ladoga and the Gulf of Finland, while the Finns had advanced south along the Karelian Isthmus, leaving the city surrounded and cut off from all communication by land. The city's only communication route was by water, over Lake Ladoga.

To service and preserve this route, the Soviets collected a fleet of over 50 merchant vessels, protected by more than 30 escort vessels, with which they ran supply convoys to the city. Against this, the Axis had little response; their only offensive force was a single Finnish warship, the motor torpedo boat Sisu, which was unable to interrupt the Soviet supply route.

In order to act against this supply route, the Axis determined to build up a naval presence on the lake, and, recognizing the Regia Marina's expertise in small boat operations, requested the dispatch of a force of MAS boats to the lake. In response the Regia Marina (RM) formed the XII MAS in April 1942.

== Formation ==
Following the request to the RM for assistance in the lake operations the RM formed the XII MAS as a section of the Decima MAS. This took place in April 1942 at La Spezia, on the Tyrrhenian Sea. XII MAS comprised four MAS boats and their crews and support staff, a total of 99 men, under the command of Capitano di Corvetta Giuseppe Bianchini.

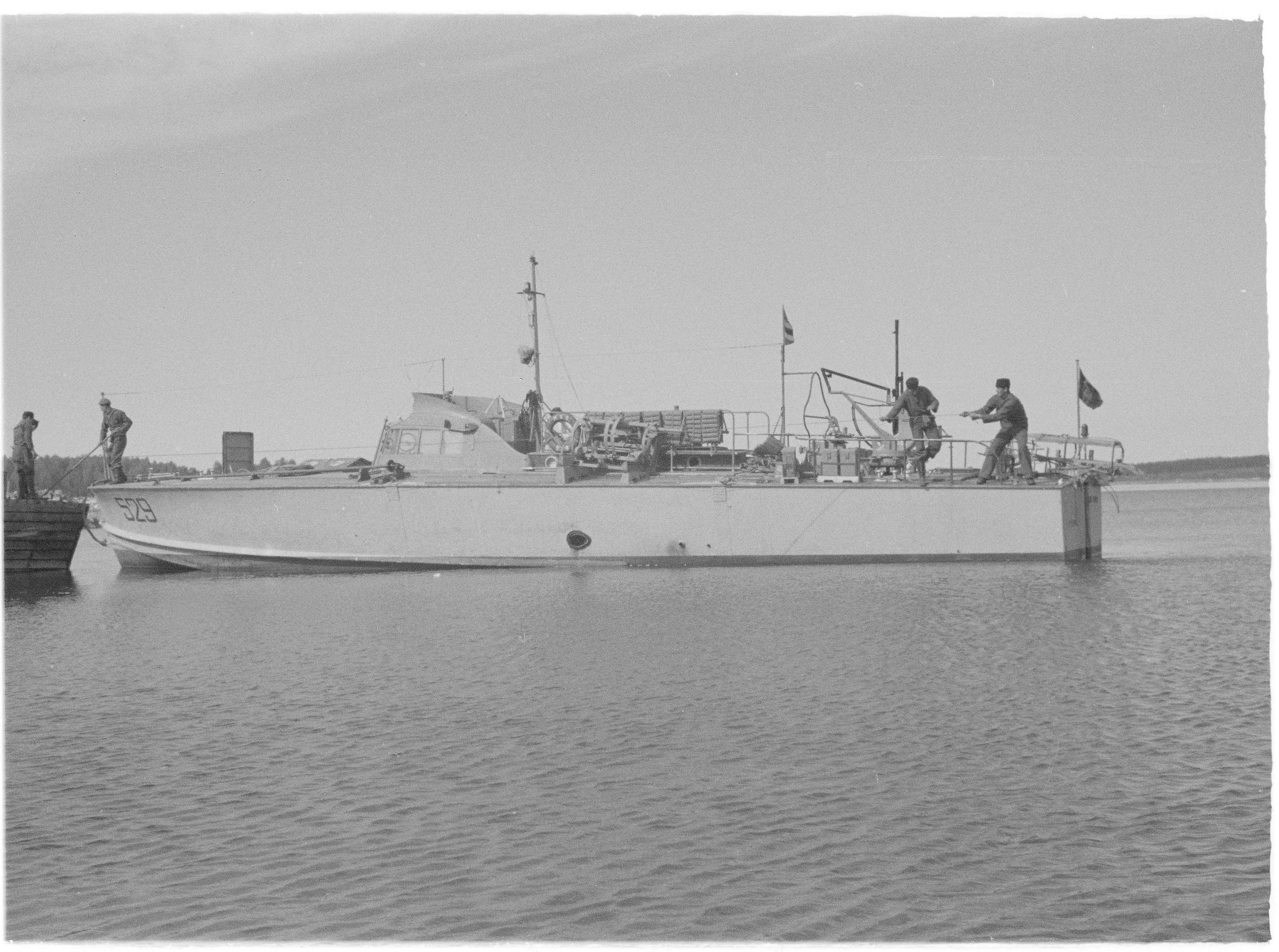
MAS 529 in Punkasalmi (Punkaharju) before loading onto a train for rail transport to Lake Ladoga, June 1942

In May 1942 the force began the journey to the lake, loading the boats onto transports for the journey overland via the Brenner Pass and Innsbruck to Stettin, and by ship to Helsinki. The final leg was by road to Sortanlahti on Lake Ladoga, which served as the XII MAS's base of operations. The naval division arrived on June 22, 1942, 12 months to the day after the opening of Barbarossa. Already on the lake was the Finnish motor torpedo boat Sisu, and five days later, four German Kriegsmarine minelaying boats (German: Küstenminenleger, lit. 'Coastal Minelayer', or KM-Boot, 'KM-boat') also arrived. This whole force was combined into an Axis formation, Naval Detachment K, under the overall command of Finnish Eversti Eino Iisakki Järvinen.

== Operational history ==
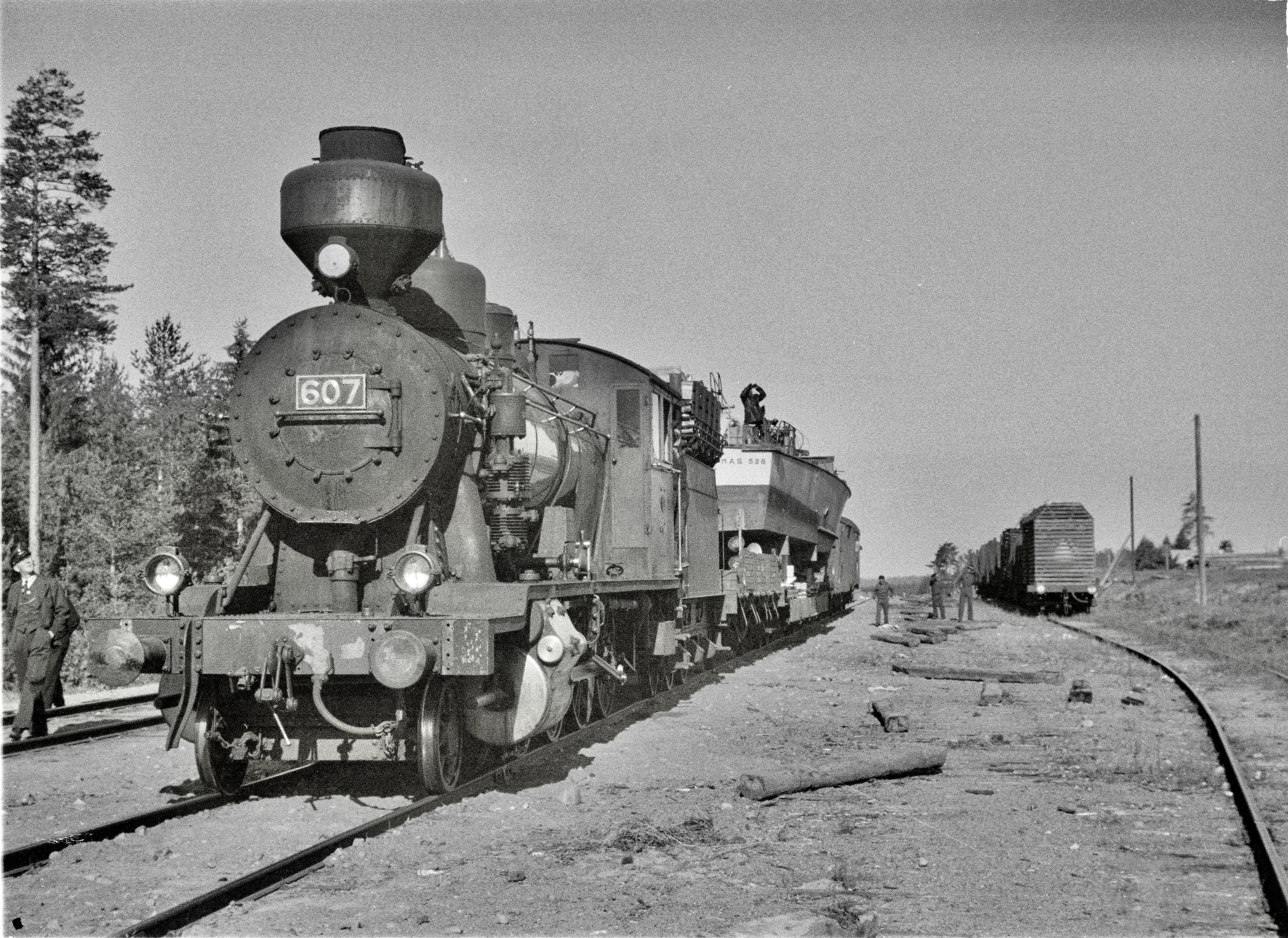
MAS 528 loaded onto a train for rail transport to Lake Ladoga, June 1942

The XII MAS commenced operations on June 25, 1942, making reconnaissance sweeps across the lake, landing observers behind Soviet lines, and searching for submarines.

On July 25, 1942, MAS 526 was damaged in an accident, and was temporarily put out of action.

On the night of August 14–15, 1942, MAS 527 and MAS 528 intercepted a force of three Soviet gunboats (according to some sources, only one MAS 527 participated in the action); after an exchange of fire the MAS closed in and launched torpedoes, sinking one of the gunboats (in reality, not a single Soviet warship was lost in this action; according to Soviet sources, the gunboats Nora and Selemdzha, and the MO-class patrol boats MO-199, MO-202 and MO-209 participated in this action on the Soviet side; one Selemdzha's Red Fleet man was wounded by enemy fire; on October 22, 1942, both of these Soviet gunboats participated in an operation to defend Sukho Island).

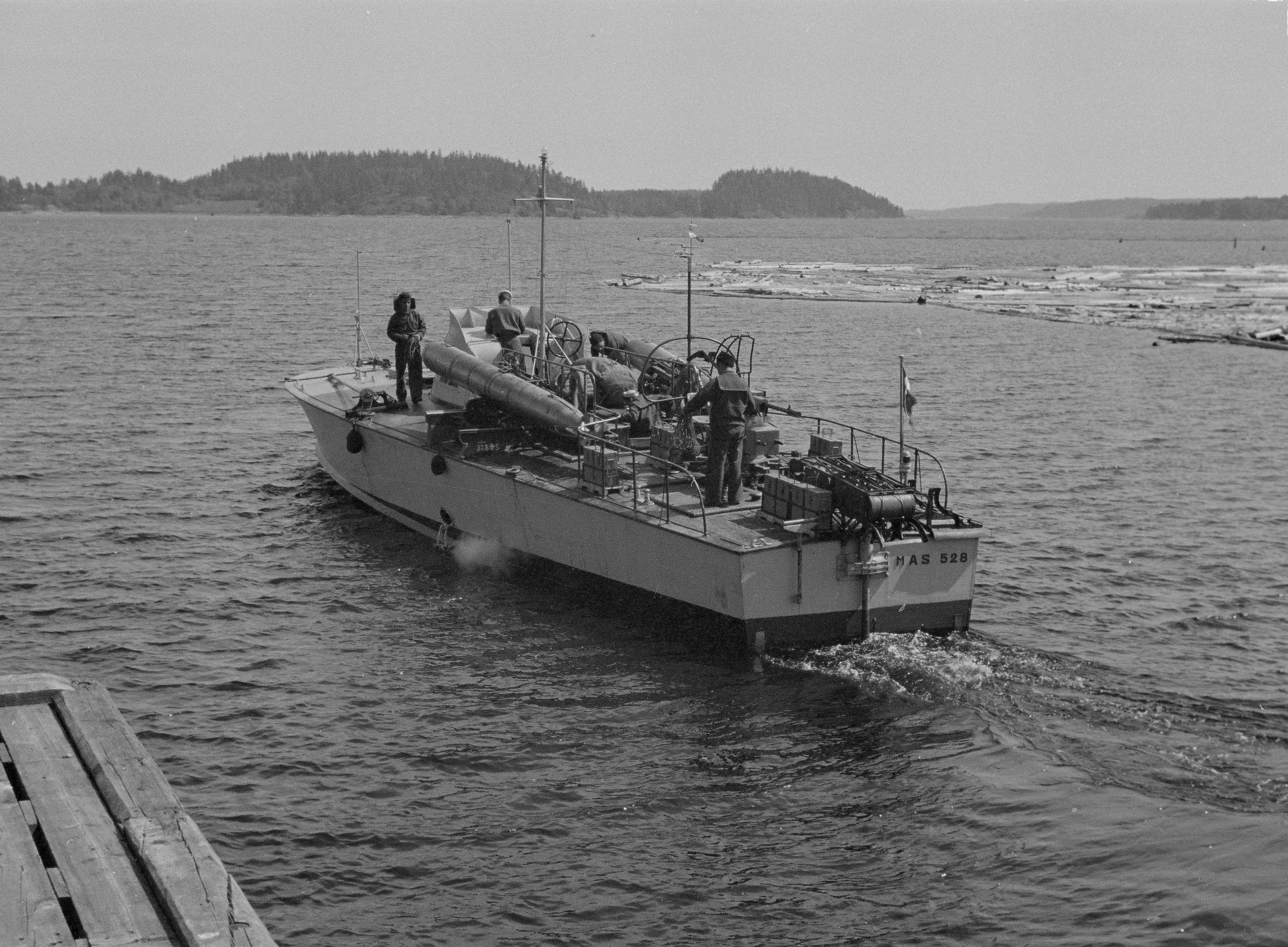
MAS 528 in Lakhdenpokhya on Lake Ladoga in the summer of 1942

On the night of August 27–28, 1942, MAS 527 encountered a Soviet convoy consisting of two tugs pulling a train of barges, escorted by a third tug. MAS 527 shadowed this group and summoned help, and with the arrival of MAS 528 attacked with torpedoes, causing the barge train to blow up (according to some sources, MAS 528 allegedly sank a 1,300 GRT lighter that was being towed by three tugs; in reality, not a single Soviet watercraft was lost on Lake Ladoga that day, although according to Soviet sources, the Soviet gunboat Sheksna reported a fruitless engagement with two enemy motorboats).

On September 1, 1942, MAS 529 met two Soviet gunboats while on patrol off Verkkosaari Island; she engaged them by gunfire, before retiring unharmed (according to some sources, one Soviet naval boat was damaged, and a starboard engine of MAS 529 failed; according to Soviet sources, the MO-class patrol boats MO-201, MO-213 and MO-215 participated in this action on the Soviet side; as a result of the engagement, six crew members of the Soviet patrol boats were wounded).

On September 29, 1942, MAS 528 and MAS 529, commanded by Bianchini, encountered a Soviet convoy of a tug and barge train, escorted by a gunboat. They were able to manoeuvre into position to make a torpedo attack, but scored no hits.

During October the force was involved in providing support to the land forces, as winter approached, and on 30 October the lake became too frozen for operations to continue. The XII MAS was evacuated from the base at Sortanlahti, withdrawing to winter quarters in Tallinn.

The spring of 1943 saw a change in the war situation; the Regia Marina decided to transfer the XII MAS to the Mediterranean, though the four MAS boats were handed over to the Finnish Navy rather than being transported back to Italy.

== Aftermath ==
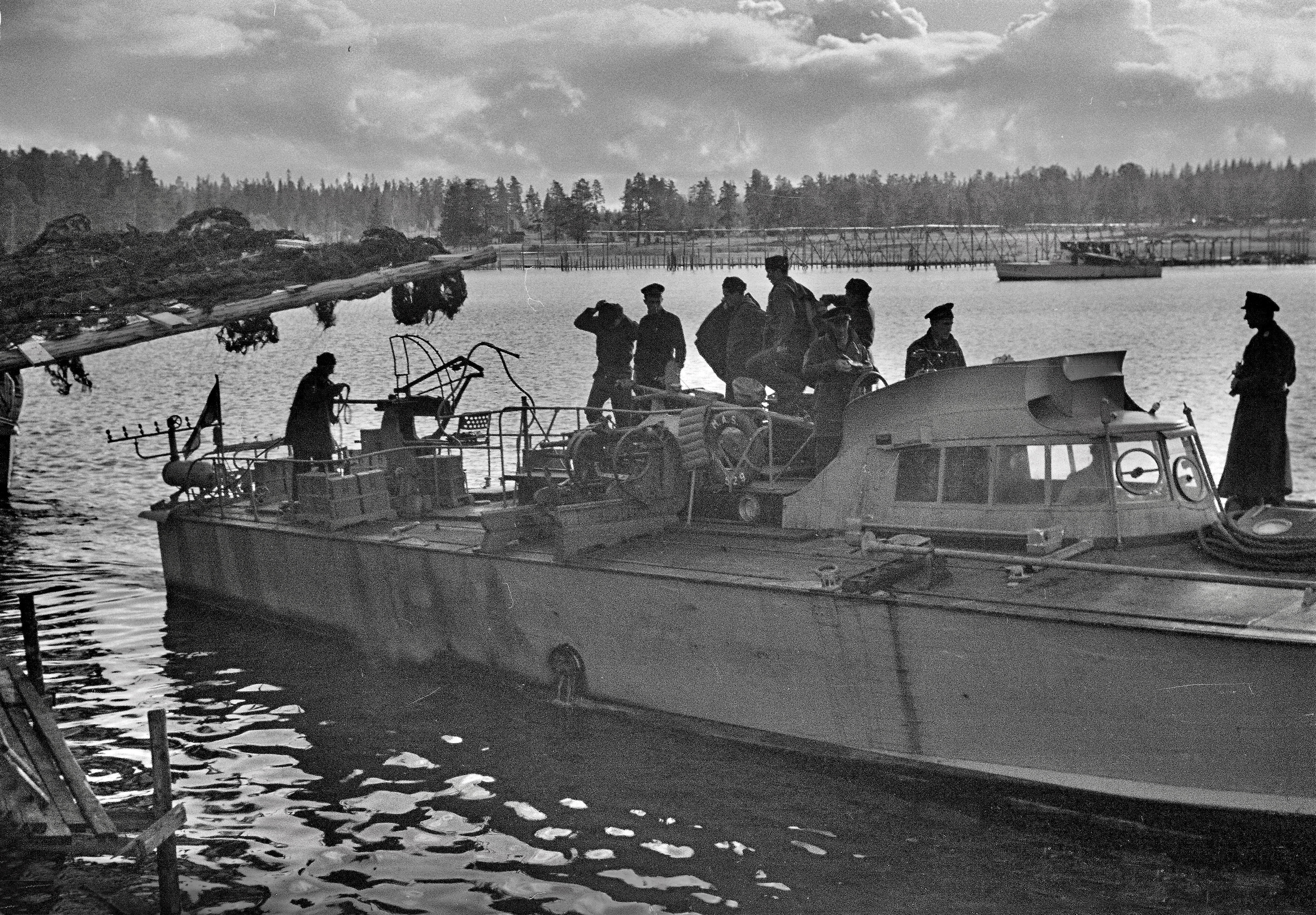
The MAS leaves Lake Ladoga, October 1942

Following its 1,000-mile journey to its area of operations, XII MAS served on Lake Ladoga for a 90-day period, making 59 tours of duty, and engaging in 17 actions, during which Soviet barges, a gunboat (Bira class, known as the Moskva class) and a 1,300-gross register ton (GRT) merchant ship were claimed to have been sunk (however, all these claims are not confirmed by Soviet sources and modern Russian research).

Despite the skill and enthusiasm which the MAS brought to this corner of the Eastern Front, the combined operation was unable to stop Soviet efforts to maintain supply route to Leningrad, and the winter of 1942–1943 saw the Sinyavino offensive and Operation Iskra, which led to an easing of the Soviet supply dilemma, though the siege was not completely lifted until January 1944.

== See also ==
- German Ladoga Flotilla
