= Siebel ferry =

WW2-era German landing craft class

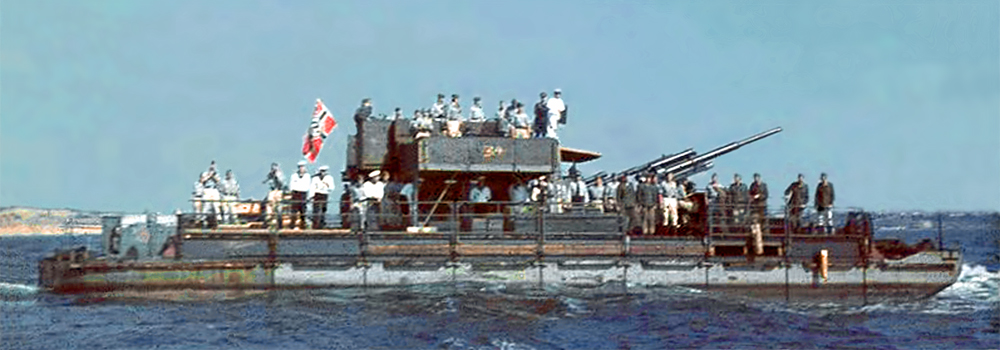
- A Siebel ferry on the Black Sea, July 1941

Class overview
- Builders: Various
- Operators: Wehrmacht; Royal Romanian Navy
- Built: 393
- Lost: 42

General characteristics
- Type: Landing Craft
- Displacement: 140–170 t (140–170 long tons; 150–190 short tons)
- Length: 32 m (105 ft)
- Beam: 15 m (49 ft)
- Draft: 1.5 to 1.8 m (4 ft 11 in to 5 ft 11 in)
- Installed power: 2 × 210 PS (207 hp) (1940); 2 × 140 PS (138 hp) (1943)
- Propulsion: 2 × BMW aircraft engines
- Speed: 11 kn (13 mph; 20 km/h) (empty)
- Range: Max 300 nmi (560 km; 350 mi)
- Capacity: 50–100 t (49–98 long tons; 55–110 short tons) cargo or vehicles, depending on version
- Complement: 11–14
- Armament: Max 1 × 3.7 cm AA gun plus 1 × quadruple 2 cm AA gun and 2 or 3 × 1.5 cm machine guns or single 2 cm AA guns (transport ferry); Max 3 × 8.8 cm (3.5 in) guns plus 2 × 3.7 cm or quadruple 2 cm AA guns (or 1 × 3.7 cm and 1 × quadruple 2 cm AA guns), or 1–4 × single 2 cm AA guns (heavy AA combat ferry); Max 4 × 3.7 cm AA guns, or 1 × 3.7 cm AA gun plus 4 × quadruple 2 cm AA guns or 2 × quadruple and 2 × single 2 cm AA guns (light AA combat ferry); 20–30 (max 48) mines (mine-laying ferry)

The Siebel ferry (Siebelfähre) was a shallow-draft catamaran landing craft operated by Germany's Wehrmacht during World War II. It served a variety of roles (transport, flak ship, gunboat, convoy escort, minelayer) in the Mediterranean, Baltic and Black Seas, as well as along the English Channel, etc. They were originally developed for Operation Sea Lion in 1940, the cancelled German invasion of England. Siebel ferries continued performing after the war's end in 1945.

== Origins and development ==
As German Army preparations for Operation Sea Lion got under way in July 1940, frustration soon grew over when and what types of ships the Kriegsmarine would supply for use in the planned Channel crossing. The immense task of converting hundreds of inland river barges and motor coasters into proper landing craft began, and the Kriegsmarine was unable to give the Army a date for their availability.

Anxious to begin landing exercises, Generalfeldmarschall Walther von Brauchitsch finally ordered General der Pioniere Alfred Jacob to build sea-going transports for the army. Jacob assigned this task to Pionier-Battalion 47 of VII Corps. The battalion moved to Carteret on the western side of the Cotentin Peninsula, and the men of this unit searched the French countryside for materials with which to construct self-propelled rafts and ferries.

Aircraft designer Friedrich ('Fritz') Siebel (a Major in the Luftwaffe, who became an Oberstleutnant on June 19, 1942, and an Oberst on September 1, 1943), putting a captured aircraft plant near Amiens in north-eastern France back into production, was approached by an Oberstleutnant from Pionier-Battalion 47. The Oberstleutnant asked Siebel if he could requisition a large pile of empty gasoline containers discarded outside next to the plant. Siebel agreed to part with the cache, provided the Oberstleutnant explained what use he would make of them. The answer interested Siebel and led him to ponder how to ferry troops and heavy equipment across the English Channel given the time and materials.

Pionier-Battalion 47 began experimenting with a host of makeshift materials for constructing powered rafts, including wine barrels, tree trunks, kapok fibre-filled sacks and ship's canvas. Early efforts to use open-ended river-crossing pontoons came to nothing. The iron beams and bolts used to hold them together failed to stand up to the waves and the pontoons were overwhelmed in a light sea.

During development, someone at German Oberkommando des Heeres (lit. 'Army High Command') thought of using a larger closed-end bridging pontoon developed during World War I by Austrian Oberst of the Engineers Hans Herbert. By spanning two connected pontoons with a 10 m × 10 m (33 ft × 33 ft) deck, guns, vehicles, and troops could be transported. This idea evolved into the Herbert ferry. Only sixty-four of these pontoons were available, too few to consider mass-production.

Another type of closed-end pontoon was available in greater numbers. This was the heavy pontoon bridge (schwere Schiffsbrücke), of which 364 were in inventory. Major Siebel, assigned a Sonderkommando (lit. 'Special Command') for improvising the Luftwaffe invasion craft, built a prototype with two heavy bridging pontoons spaced 6 m (19 ft 8 in) apart in a catamaran arrangement connected by steel cross-beams. In the center, mounted on a pyramid-shaped truss-work, were two surplus aircraft engines end-to-end. This vessel was given the name kleine Fähre (lit. 'small ferry') and initial testing was conducted on Lake Rangsdorf (Rangsdorfer See), a lake near Berlin.

Chief of the Army General Staff Generaloberst Franz Halder and a party of other Army officers were invited to witness one of these tests, but they were unimpressed by the ferry's performance. It could only make 4 kn (4.6 mph; 7.4 km/h) and seemed overly flimsy. Halder noted "Nothing new, may not stand up in surf." Others in the party questioned whether transported soldiers would arrive in fighting condition.

Despite the Army's misgivings, Siebel continued working on modifying the ferry's design, reducing the 6 m (19 ft 8 in) spacing between the pontoons to 5.5 m (18 ft 1 in), and requesting from Krupp-Rheinhausen (with assistance from Wasserprüfung 5) construction of a large steel platform covered with wood planking. This would serve as the vessel's cargo deck, and also provide longitudinal and lateral strength to withstand operating on the sea. This version would prove capable of surviving waves generated by Force 6 winds.

The only propulsion systems available in the quantities for mass-production of these invasion craft were diesel truck engines and aircraft engines. In consultation with engineers from Pionier-Battalion 47, Siebel settled on a combination of four 75 PS (74 hp) Ford V-8 engines (two each mounted side-by-side in the aft end of the pontoons) linked to standard marine propellers. For auxiliary power, three BMW VI aircraft engines (750 PS or 740 hp total power) could mount on elevated platforms along the aft edge of the cargo deck, turning airscrew propellers.

Early problems with this arrangement included engine failure due to insufficient cooling, solved by linking the water-cooled aircraft engines to the diesel truck engines via piping to the pontoon compartments. Steering the craft by water screws alone also presented difficulties. An engine telegraph connected the wheelhouse to the two pontoon engine crews. But because of the vessel's broad beam, the crews had to react simultaneously to requests for changes in speed or the ferry would begin turning, a movement the rudders could barely counteract.

On 31 August 1940, the new Siebel ferry was tested in the Ems estuary by the Special Command of the Merchant Shipping Division. Using only the ship's aircraft engines, it attained a maximum speed of 8 kn (9.2 mph; 15 km/h). In contrast to the truck engines in the pontoons, the aero engines were directly controlled by the helmsman via throttles in the wheelhouse, allowing him to vary each engine's RPM. This greatly improved manoeuvrability, but the aircraft engines were noisy, prevented voice communication on deck, and consumed large amounts of fuel. For Sea Lion, it was decided to use them only for the run-up onto the invasion beaches or as a back-up in the event the water screws were damaged.

On 4 September, two additional versions of the Siebel ferry, one powered by Opel Blitz truck engines and one powered by Ford V-8s were tested on the Ems estuary. Using only water screw propulsion, they achieved a cruising speed of 7 kn (8.1 mph; 13 km/h), although it was believed this could be raised through efficient propellers.

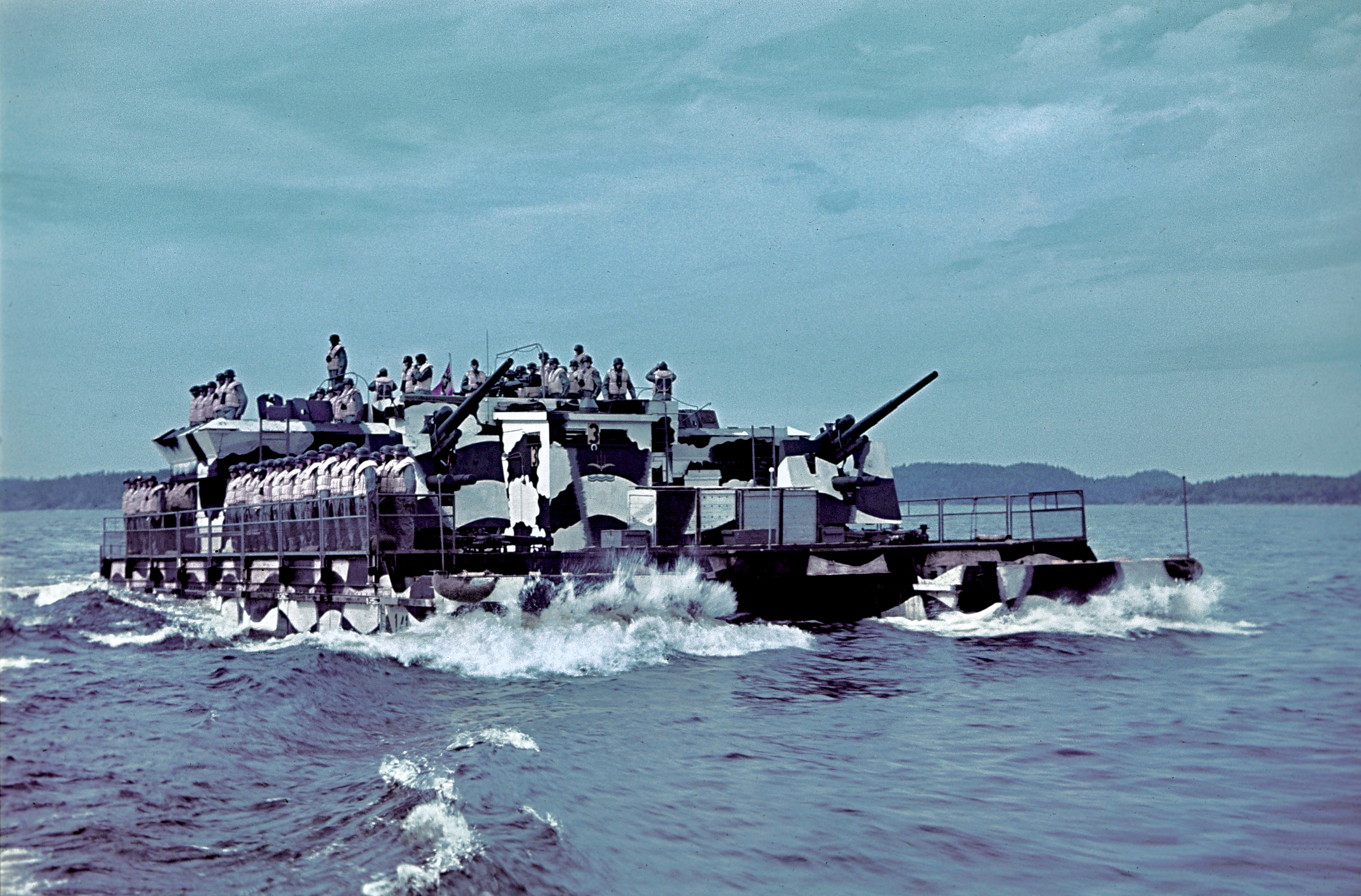
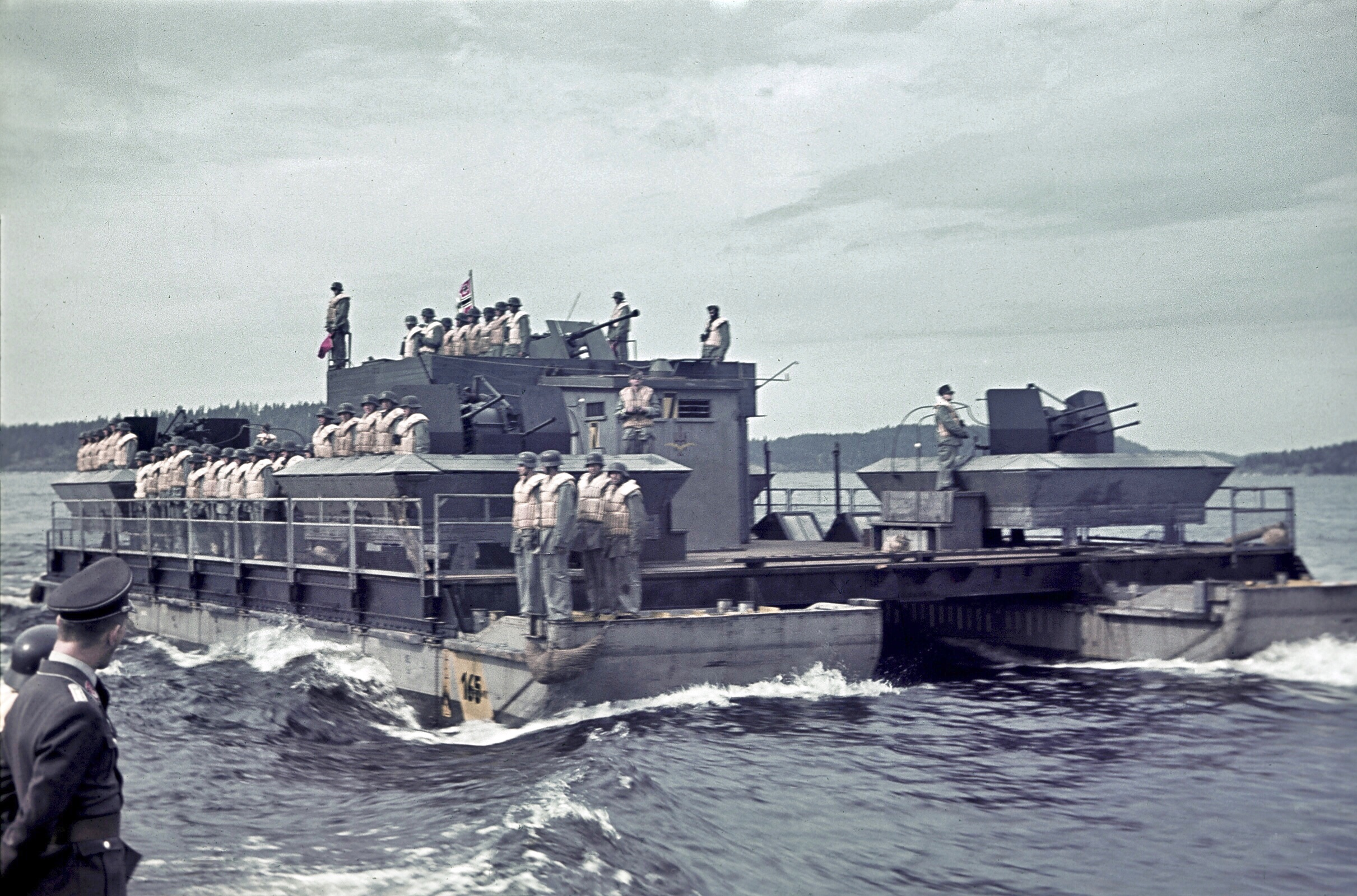
A German heavy (top) and a light (bottom) anti-aircraft combat Siebel ferry at Lakhdenpokhya on Lake Ladoga, August 1942

The Siebel ferry pontoons were flat-bottom and square in front. In combination with the vessel's wide cargo deck, this made for an exceptionally stable gun platform. The Luftwaffe mounted various-sized flak pieces on the ferries, and tested their suitability for engaging both air and surface targets while at sea. The versatile 8.8 cm guns proved well-suited for this role.

Series production of the Siebel ferry began in September 1940 at Antwerp as a joint Army–Luftwaffe venture with the Army's Böndel Pionier-Sonderkommando (lit. 'Böndel's Engineer Special Command', i.e. under the command of Major Konrad Böndel) assembling the pontoons, decking and water propulsion while Major Siebel's Luftwaffe-Sonderkommando installed the auxiliary aircraft engines. By late September, twenty-five of these craft were complete.

For Operation Sea Lion, the Luftwaffe organized the Siebel ferries into two flotillas: I Flak Corps (assigned to 9th Army) and II Flak Corps (assigned to 16th Army) to provide flank defense against air, ground, and surface targets for the First Wave tow formations. Each Siebel ferry could transport a complete flak unit consisting of one 8.8 cm gun and two 2 cm guns plus their three prime movers (although 9th Army planned to transport the necessary towing vehicles and support personnel separately via barges). Upon reaching the invasion beaches, the ferries could land their flak units, then assist with unloading the larger steamers anchored offshore. The Army referred to the Siebel ferries as "destroyer substitutes".

== Wartime service ==
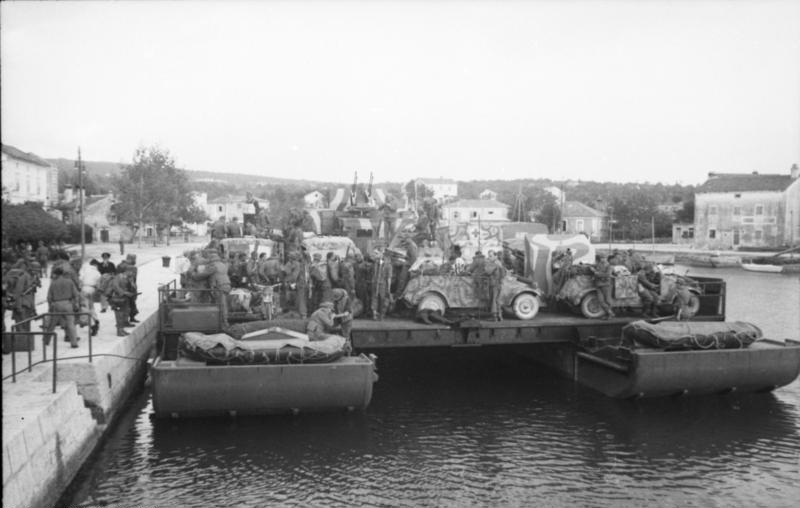
Bow view of a German Siebel ferry showing the twin catamaran pontoons and a multitude of trucks and light vehicles parked on deck. Note also the 2 cm Flakvierling 38 mounted atop the wheelhouse (center of picture) for AA protection

With its simplicity of design, sturdy construction, good sea-keeping, and the ease with which it could be dismantled and shipped via rail to virtually any point on the continent, the Siebel ferry proved an adaptable amphibious vessel for transporting troops, vehicles, and supplies across open water. It was also easily-configured to serve a variety of purposes, from minelaying to convoy escort.

When Sea Lion was abandoned, in October 1940, the Luftwaffe decided, in the fall of 1941, to continue producing Siebel ferries independently of the Army under its Fähre-Sonderkommando (lit. 'Special Ferry Command'). It replaced the diesel truck engines on the original design with BMW and other type aircraft engines, housing four of them in enlarged pontoon ends connected to water screws via a reversing gearbox. Some of these vessels were assigned to the Army and operated with mixed crews, but the Army disliked the use of aircraft engines, claiming they were prone to catching fire and consumed excessive amounts of fuel. The Army Engineer Ferry Construction Command at Antwerp continued using vehicle engines as the main propulsion unit, and considered them reliable compared to the Luftwaffe's aircraft engines. Ten were built for Operation Herkules, the planned invasion of Malta, although it was cancelled.

Two ferries were transferred to the Royal Romanian Navy in late 1941. A wreck lies submerged in Croatia.

== Bibliography ==
- Ansel, Walter (1960). Hitler Confronts England. Durham, NC: Duke University Press. OCLC 396014.
- Gröner, Erich; Jung, Dieter; Maass, Martin (1990). Die deutschen Kriegsschiffe, 1815–1945 [German Warships, 1815–1945] (in German). Vol. 7. Koblenz, DE: Bernard & Graefe Verlag. pp. 47–57. ISBN 3-7637-4807-5.
- Gröner, Erich (2001). Die Schiffe der Deutschen Kriegsmarine und Luftwaffe 1939–1945 (in German). Bernard & Graefe. ISBN 978-3-7637-6215-6.
- Kieser, Egbert (1997). Hitler on the Doorstep: Operation 'Sea Lion', The German Plan To Invade Britain, 1940. Naval Institute Press. ISBN 1-55750-390-7.
- Kugler, Randolf (1989). Das Landungswesen in Deutschland seit 1900 (in German). Buchzentrum, Empfingen. ISBN 978-3-86755-000-0.
- Lenton, H. T. (1976). German Warships of the Second World War. Arco. ISBN 978-0-668-04037-2.
- Levine, Alan J. (2008). The War Against Rommel's Supply Lines, 1942–43. Stackpole Books. ISBN 978-0-8117-3458-5.
- Pawlas, Karl R. (December 1977 – February 1978). "Die Schwimmende Festung (Flak-Kapffähre)". Waffen Revue (in German) (27). Nürnberg: Publizistisches Archiv für Militär- und Waffenwesen. OCLC 13306182.
- Schenk, Peter (1990). Invasion of England 1940: The Planning of Operation Sealion. Conway Maritime Press. ISBN 0-85177-548-9.
