= Siege of Leningrad =

Blockade by the Axis powers, 1941–1944

- Part of the Eastern Front of World War II
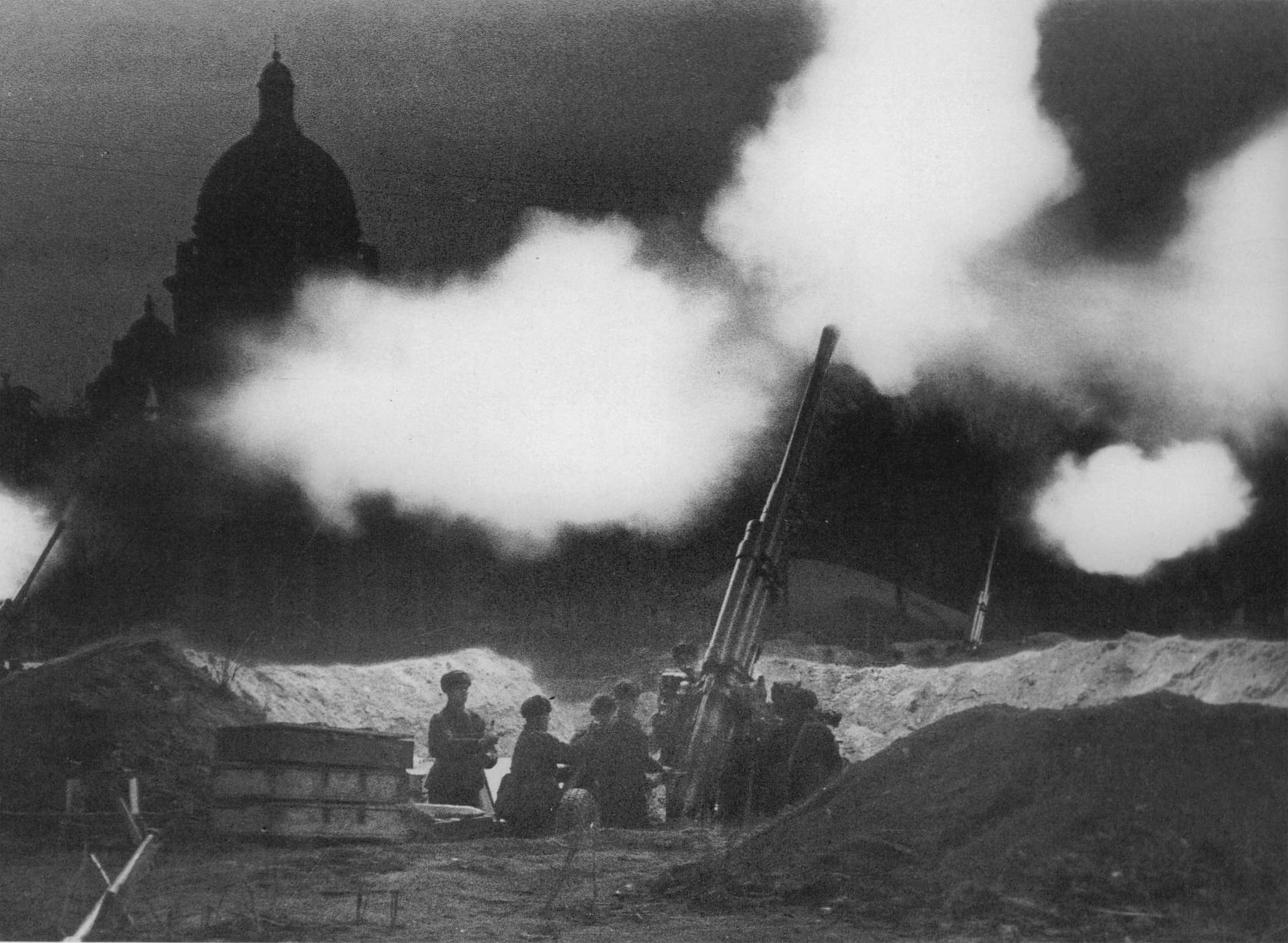
- Soviet anti-aircraft battery in Leningrad near Saint Isaac's Cathedral, 1941
Date	8 September 1941 – 27 January 1944 (2 years, 4 months and 19 days)
Location	Leningrad, Russian SFSR, Soviet Union (present-day Saint Petersburg, Russia); 59°55′49″N 30°19′09″E
Result	Soviet victory
Territorial changes	Axis forces are repelled 60–100 km (37–62 mi) away from Leningrad

Belligerents
Germany; Finland; Naval support: Italy	Soviet Union

Commanders and leaders
(Nazi Germany) Wilhelm Ritter von Leeb; (Nazi Germany) Georg von Küchler; (Finland) C.G.E. Mannerheim	(Soviet Union) Markian Popov; (Soviet Union) Kliment Voroshilov; (Soviet Union) Georgy Zhukov; (Soviet Union) Kirill Meretskov

Strength
Initial: 725,000	Initial: 930,000

Casualties and losses
579,985 killed, wounded, or missing	3,473,066 casualties (Note: 1,017,881 killed, captured or missing. 2,418,185 wounded and sick.)
- Soviet civilians: 1,042,000: 642,000 during the siege; 400,000 at evacuations; Total dead: 1,300,000 to 2,000,000

The siege of Leningrad was a military blockade undertaken by the Axis powers against the city of Leningrad (present-day Saint Petersburg) in the Soviet Union on the Eastern Front of World War II from 1941 to 1944. Leningrad, the country's second largest city, was besieged by Germany and Finland for 872 days, but never captured. The siege was the most destructive in history and possibly the most deadly, causing an estimated 1.5 million deaths, from a prewar population of 3.2 million. Some historians have classified it as a genocide due to the intentional destruction of the city and the systematic starvation of its civilian population.

In August 1941, Germany's Army Group North reached the suburbs of Leningrad as Finnish forces moved to encircle the city from the north. Land routes from Leningrad to the rest of the Soviet Union were cut on 8 September 1941, beginning the siege. The Germans decided to bomb the city and starve its inhabitants rather than attempt to capture it; many residents starved during the winter of 1941–1942. Supplies were delivered to the city by air, by ship over Lake Ladoga, or over the Road of Life, a highway built on the lake when it was frozen. A Red Army offensive opened a narrow land corridor to Leningrad on 18 January 1943, but the siege was not fully broken until 27 January 1944.

== Background ==
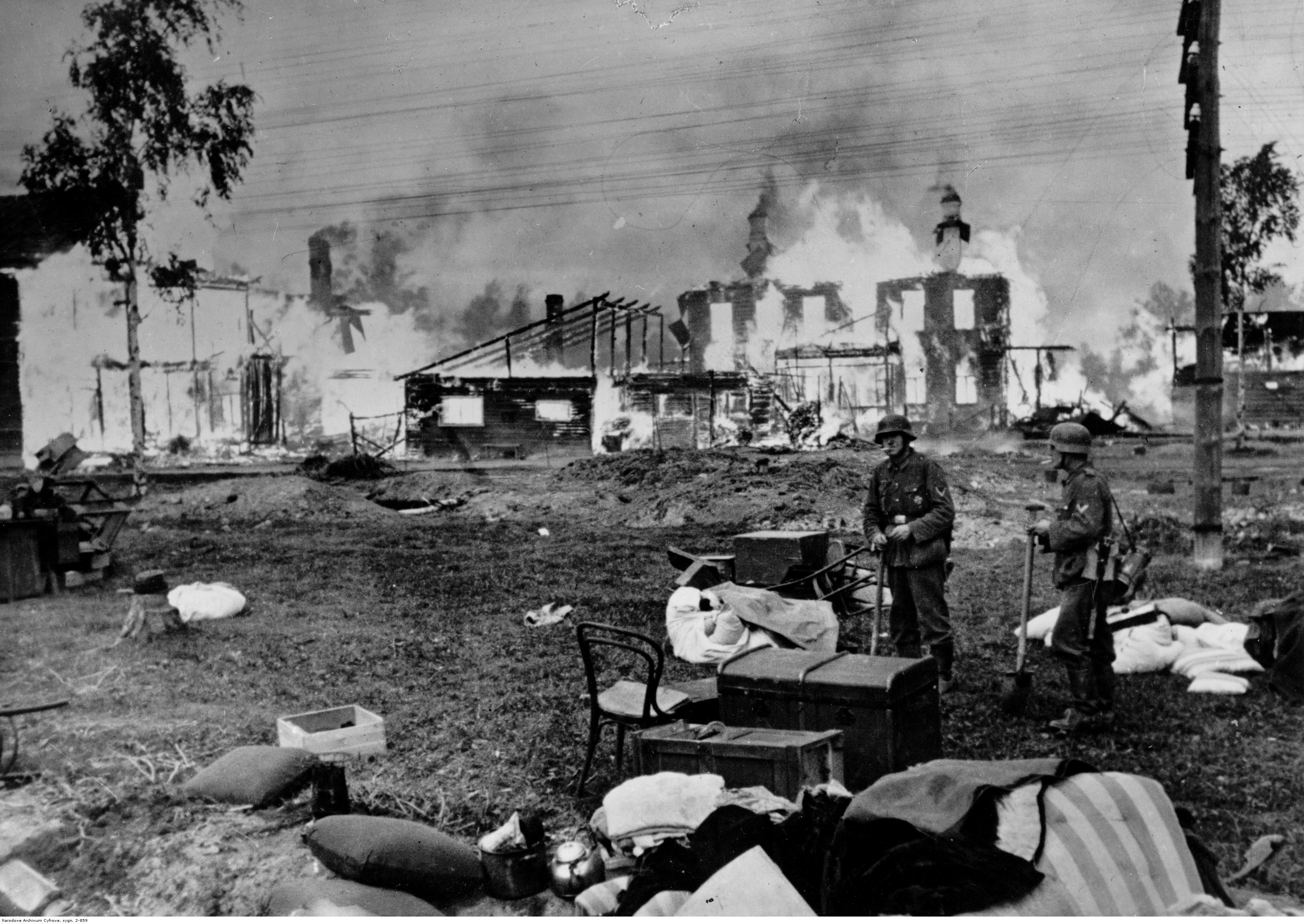
German soldiers in front of burning houses and a church, near Leningrad in 1941

The capture of Leningrad was one of three strategic goals of the German Operation Barbarossa and as a result, Leningrad was the main target of Army Group North. The strategy was motivated by Leningrad's political status as the former capital of Russia, its symbolic status as the birthplace of the Russian Revolution and the ideological center of Bolshevism, its military importance as a main base of the Soviet Baltic Fleet, and its industrial strength, including its numerous arms factories. In 1939, the city was responsible for 11% of all Soviet industrial output.

It has been said that Adolf Hitler was so confident that he would capture Leningrad that he stated that the victory celebrations would be held in the city's Hotel Astoria and he also had invitations printed.

Although various theories about Germany's plans for Leningrad have been put forward, including the theory that Germany planned to make it the capital of the new Ingermanland province of the Reich in Generalplan Ost, it is clear that Hitler intended to utterly destroy the city along with its population. According to a directive which was sent to Army Group North on 29 September 1941:

After the defeat of Soviet Russia there can be no interest in the continued existence of this large urban center. [...] Following the city's encirclement, requests for surrender negotiations shall be denied, since the problem of relocating and feeding the population cannot and should not be solved by us. In this war for our very existence, we can have no interest in maintaining even a part of this very large urban population.

Hitler's ultimate plan was to raze Leningrad and give areas north of the Neva to the Finns.

== Preparations ==
=== German plans ===
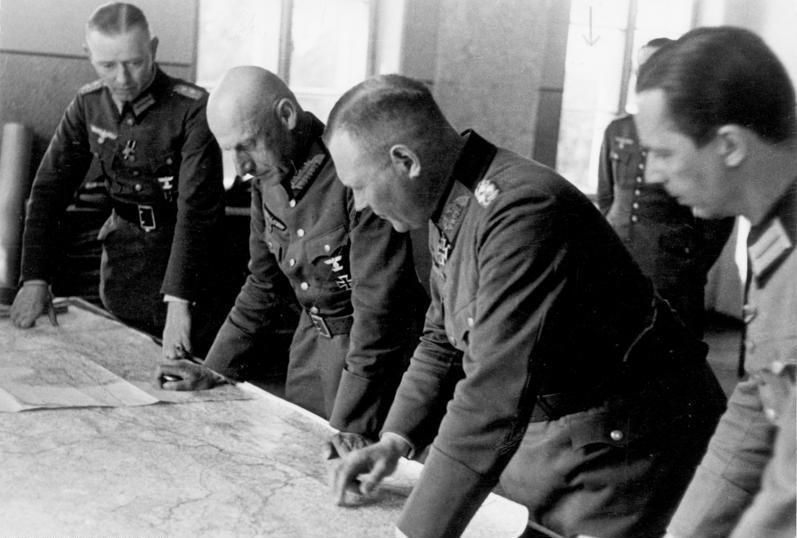
Wilhelm Ritter von Leeb with Erich Hoepner in September 1941

Army Group North under Field Marshal Wilhelm Ritter von Leeb advanced to Leningrad, its primary objective. By early August, Army Group North was seriously over-extended, having advanced on a widening front and dispersed its forces on several axes of advance. Leeb estimated he needed 35 divisions for all of his tasks, while he only had 26. The attack resumed on 10 August but immediately encountered strong opposition around Luga. Elsewhere, Leeb's forces were able to take Kingisepp and Narva on 17 August. The army group reached Chudovo on 20 August, severing the rail link between Leningrad and Moscow. Tallinn was captured on 28 August.

Finnish military forces were north of Leningrad, while German forces occupied territories to the south. Both German and Finnish forces had the goal of encircling Leningrad and maintaining the siege perimeter, thus cutting off all communication with the city and preventing the defenders from receiving any supplies – although Finnish participation in the siege mainly consisted of a recapture of lands lost in the Winter War. The Germans planned on lack of food being their chief weapon against the citizens; German scientists had calculated the city would reach starvation after only a few weeks.

=== Leningrad fortified region ===
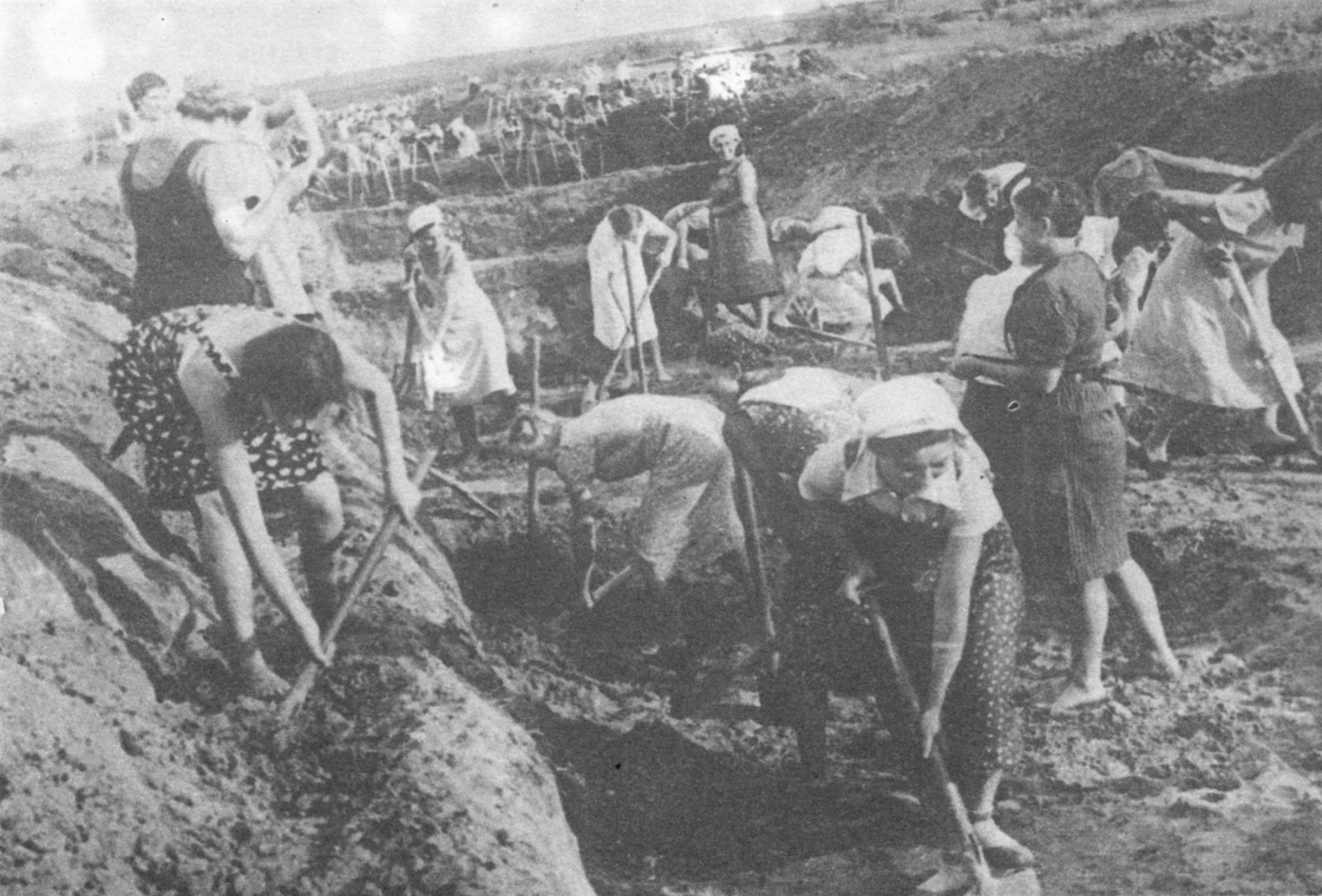
Women from Leningrad digging an anti-tank ditch, July 1941

On Friday, 27 June 1941, the Council of Deputies of the Leningrad Soviet organised "First response groups" of civilians. In the next days, Leningrad's civilian population was informed of the danger and over a million citizens were mobilised for the construction of fortifications. Several lines of defences were built along the city's perimeter to repel hostile forces approaching from north and south by means of civilian resistance.

In the south, the fortified line ran from the mouth of the Luga River to Chudovo, Gatchina (Krasnoarmeysk until 1944), Uritsk, Pulkovo and then through the Neva River. Another line of defence passed through Peterhof to Gatchina, Pulkovo, Kolpino and Koltushy. In the north the defensive line against the Finns, the Karelian Fortified Region, had been maintained in Leningrad's northern suburbs since the 1930s, and was now returned to service. A total of 306 km (190 mi) of timber barricades, 635 km (395 mi) of wire entanglements, 700 km (430 mi) of anti-tank ditches, 5,000 earth-and-timber emplacements and reinforced concrete weapon emplacements and 25,000 km (16,000 mi) of open trenches were constructed or excavated by civilians. Even the guns from the cruiser Aurora were removed from the ship to be used to defend Leningrad.

== Establishment ==
The 4th Panzer Group from East Prussia took Pskov after a swift advance and reached Novgorod by 16 August. After the capture of Novgorod, General Hoepner's 4th Panzer Group continued its progress toward Leningrad. But the 18th Army – despite some 350,000 men lagging behind – forced its way to Ostrov and Pskov after the Soviet troops of the Northwestern Front retreated toward Leningrad. On 10 July, both Ostrov and Pskov were captured and the 18th Army reached Narva and Kingisepp, from where advance toward Leningrad continued from the Luga River line. This created siege positions from the Gulf of Finland to Lake Ladoga, with the eventual aim of isolating Leningrad from all directions. The Finnish Army was then expected to advance along Lake Ladoga's eastern shore.

The last rail connection to Leningrad was cut on 30 August, when the German forces reached the River Neva. In early September, Leeb was confident Leningrad was about to fall. Having received reports on the evacuation of civilians and industrial goods, Leeb and the OKH believed the Red Army was preparing to abandon the city. Consequently, on 5 September, he received new orders, including the destruction of the Red Army forces around the city. By 15 September, Panzer Group 4 was to be transferred to Army Group Centre so it could participate in a renewed offensive toward Moscow. The expected surrender did not materialise, although the renewed German offensive cut off the city by 8 September. Lacking sufficient strength for major operations, Leeb had to accept that the army group might not be able to take the city, although hard fighting continued along his front throughout October and November.

=== Orders of battle ===
==== Germany ====
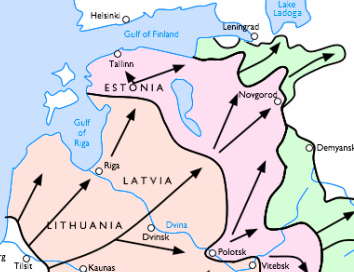
Map of Army Group North's advance into the USSR in 1941. Coral up to 9 July, pink up to 1 September and green up to 5 December.

- Army Group North (Feldmarschall Wilhelm Ritter von Leeb)
  - 18th Army (Georg von Küchler)
    - XXXXII Corps (2 infantry divisions)
    - XXVI Corps (3 infantry divisions)
  - 16th Army (Ernst Busch)
    - XXVIII Corps (Mauritz von Wiktorin) (2 infantry, 1 armoured divisions)
    - I Corps (2 infantry divisions)
    - X Corps (3 infantry divisions)
    - II Corps (3 infantry divisions)
    - (L Corps – Under 9th Army) (2 infantry divisions)
  - 4th Panzer Group (Erich Hoepner)
    - XXXVIII Corps (Friedrich-Wilhelm von Chappuis) (1 infantry division)
    - XXXXI Motorized Corps (Georg-Hans Reinhardt) (1 infantry, 1 motorised, 1 armoured divisions)
    - LVI Motorized Corps (Erich von Manstein) (1 infantry, 1 motorised, 1 armoured, 1 panzergrenadier divisions)

==== Finland ====
- Finnish Defence Forces HQ (Finnish marshal Mannerheim)
  - I Corps (2 infantry divisions)
  - II Corps (2 infantry divisions)
  - IV Corps (3 infantry divisions)

==== Italy ====
- XII Squadriglia MAS (Mezzi d'Assalto) (Italian for "12th Assault Vessel Squadron") (C.C. Giuseppe Bianchini) Regia Marina

==== Spain ====
- Blue Division, officially designated as 250. Infanterie-Division by the German Army and as the División Española de Voluntarios by the Spanish Army; General Esteban Infantes took command of this unit of Spanish volunteers at the Eastern Front during World War II.

==== Soviet Union ====
- Northern Front (Lieutenant General Popov)
  - 7th Army (2 rifle, 1 militia divisions, 1 naval infantry brigade, 3 motorised rifle and 1 armoured regiments)
  - 8th Army
    - 10th Rifle Corps (2 rifle divisions)
    - 11th Rifle Corps (3 rifle divisions)
    - Separate units (3 rifle divisions)
  - 14th Army
    - 42nd Rifle Corps (2 rifle divisions)
    - Separate units (2 rifle divisions, 1 fortified area, 1 motorised rifle regiment)
  - 23rd Army
    - 19th Rifle Corps (3 rifle divisions)
    - Separate units (2 rifle, 1 motorised divisions, 2 fortified areas, 1 rifle regiment)
  - Luga Operation Group
    - 41st Rifle Corps (3 rifle divisions)
    - Separate units (1 armoured brigade, 1 rifle regiment)
  - Kingisepp Operation Group
    - Separate units (2 rifle, 2 militia, 1 armoured divisions, 1 fortified area)
  - Separate units (3 rifle divisions, 4 guard militia divisions, 3 fortified areas, 1 rifle brigade)

The 14th Army of the Soviet Red Army defended Murmansk and the 7th Army defended Ladoga Karelia; thus they did not participate in the initial stages of the siege. The 8th Army was initially part of the Northwestern Front and retreated through the Baltics. It was transferred to the Northern Front on 14 July when the Soviets evacuated Tallinn.

On 23 August, the Northern Front was divided into the Leningrad Front and the Karelian Front, as it became impossible for front headquarters to control everything between Murmansk and Leningrad.

Marshal Georgy Zhukov said, "Ten volunteer opolcheniye divisions were formed in Leningrad in the first three months of the war, as well as 16 separate artillery and machine-gun opolcheniye battalions."

=== Severing the lines of communication ===
On 6 August, Hitler repeated his order: "Leningrad first, Donetsk Basin second, Moscow third." Arctic convoys using the Northern Sea Route delivered American Lend-Lease and British food and war materiel supplies to the Murmansk railhead (although the rail link to Leningrad was cut off by Finnish armies just north of the city), as well as several other locations in Lapland.

=== Encirclement of Leningrad ===
Axis encirclement of Leningrad

Finnish intelligence broke some Soviet military codes and read their low-level communications. This was particularly helpful for Hitler, who constantly requested intelligence information about Leningrad. Finland's role in Operation Barbarossa was laid out in Hitler's Directive 21: "The mass of the Finnish army will have the task, in accordance with the advance made by the northern wing of the German armies, of tying up maximum Russian [sic] strength by attacking to the west, or on both sides, of Lake Ladoga." The last rail connection to Leningrad was severed on 30 August 1941, when the Germans reached the Neva River. On 8 September, the road to the besieged city was severed when the Germans reached Lake Ladoga at Shlisselburg, leaving just a corridor of land between Lake Ladoga and Leningrad which remained unoccupied by Axis forces. Bombing on 8 September caused 178 fires.

On 21 September 1941, German High Command considered how to destroy Leningrad. Occupying the city was ruled out "because it would make us responsible for food supply". The resolution was to lay the city under siege and bombardment, starving its population. "Early next year, we [will] enter the city (if the Finns do it first we do not object), lead those still alive into inner Russia or into captivity, wipe Leningrad from the face of the earth through demolitions, and hand the area north of the Neva to the Finns." On 7 October, Hitler sent a further directive signed by Alfred Jodl reminding Army Group North not to accept capitulation.

=== Finnish participation ===
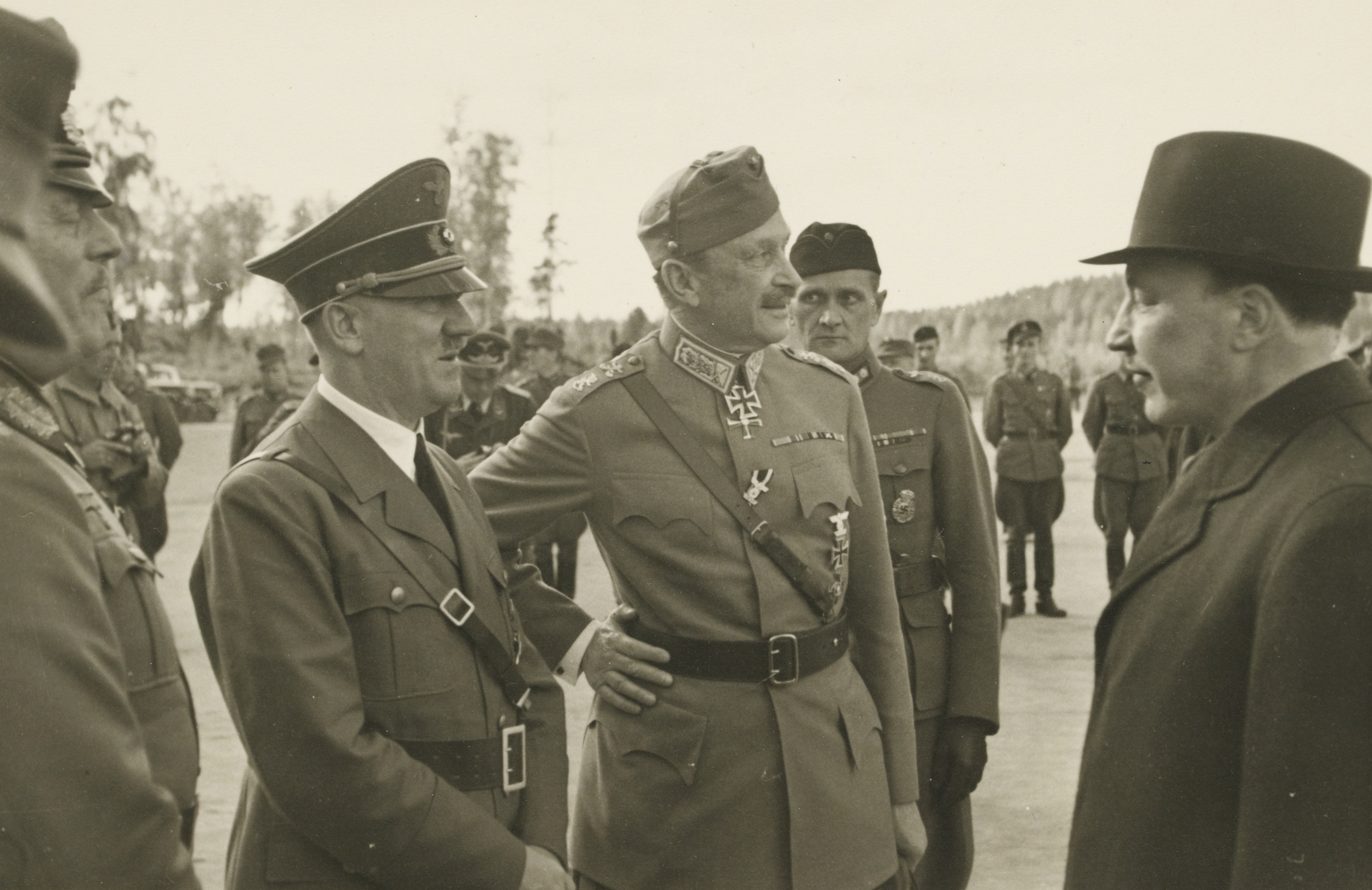
Hitler with Finland's Marshal Carl Gustav Mannerheim and President Risto Ryti meeting in Imatra in 1942

By August 1941, the Finns advanced to within 20 km (12 mi) of the northern suburbs of Leningrad at the 1939 Finnish-Soviet border, threatening the city from the north; they were also advancing through East Karelia, east of Lake Ladoga, and threatening the city from the east. The Finnish forces crossed the pre-Winter War border on the Karelian Isthmus by eliminating Soviet salients at Beloostrov and Kirjasalo, thus straightening the frontline so that it ran along the old border near the shores of Gulf of Finland and Lake Ladoga, and those positions closest to Leningrad still lying on the pre-Winter War border.

According to Soviet claims, the Finnish advance was stopped in September by resistance in the Karelian Fortified Region, but in August 1941 Finnish troops had already received orders to halt the advance after reaching their goals, some of which lay beyond the pre-Winter War border. After reaching their respective goals, the Finns halted their advance and started moving troops to East Karelia.

For the next three years, the Finns did little to contribute to the battle for Leningrad, maintaining their lines. Their headquarters rejected German pleas for aerial attacks against Leningrad and did not advance farther south from the Svir River in occupied East Karelia (160 kilometres northeast of Leningrad), which they had reached on 7 September. In the southeast, the Germans captured Tikhvin on 8 November, but failed to complete their encirclement of Leningrad by advancing further north to join with the Finns at the Svir River. On 9 December, a counterattack of the Volkhov Front forced the Wehrmacht to retreat from their Tikhvin positions in the Volkhov River line.

On 6 September 1941, Germany's chief of staff, Alfred Jodl, visited Helsinki. His main goal was to persuade Mannerheim to continue the offensive. In 1941, President Ryti told the Finnish Parliament that the aim of the war was to restore the territories lost during the Winter War and gain more territories in the east to create a "Greater Finland". After the war, Ryti said: "On 24 August 1941 I visited the headquarters of Marshal Mannerheim. The Germans aimed us at crossing the old border and continuing the offensive to Leningrad. I said that the capture of Leningrad was not our goal and that we should not take part in it. Mannerheim and Minister of Defense Walden agreed with me and refused the offers of the Germans. The result was a paradoxical situation: the Germans could not approach Leningrad from the north". There was little or no systematic shelling or bombing from the Finnish positions.

The proximity of the Finnish border – 33–35 km (21–22 mi) from downtown Leningrad – and the threat of a Finnish attack complicated the defence of the city. At one point, the defending front commander, Popov, could not release reserves opposing the Finnish forces to be deployed against the Wehrmacht because they were needed to bolster the 23rd Army's defences on the Karelian Isthmus. Mannerheim terminated the offensive on 31 August 1941, when the army had reached the 1939 border. Popov felt relieved, and redeployed two divisions to the German sector on 5 September.

Subsequently, the Finnish forces reduced the salients of Beloostrov and Kirjasalo, which had threatened their positions at the seacoast and south of the River Vuoksi. Lieutenant General Paavo Talvela and Colonel Järvinen, the commander of the Finnish Coastal Brigade responsible for Ladoga, proposed to the German headquarters the blocking of Soviet convoys on Lake Ladoga. The idea was proposed on their own behalf, bypassing both Finnish Navy HQ and General HQ. The Germans responded favorably and informed the slightly surprised Finns – who apart from Talvela and Järvinen had very little knowledge of the proposition – that transport of the equipment for the Ladoga operation was already arranged. The German command formed the international naval detachment (which also included the Italian XII Squadriglia MAS) under Finnish command and the Einsatzstab Fähre Ost under German command. These naval units operated against the supply route in the summer and autumn of 1942, the only seasons in which the units were able to operate before freezing waters forced the lightly equipped units to be moved away. Changes in front lines made it impractical to re-establish these units later in the war.

=== Defensive operations ===
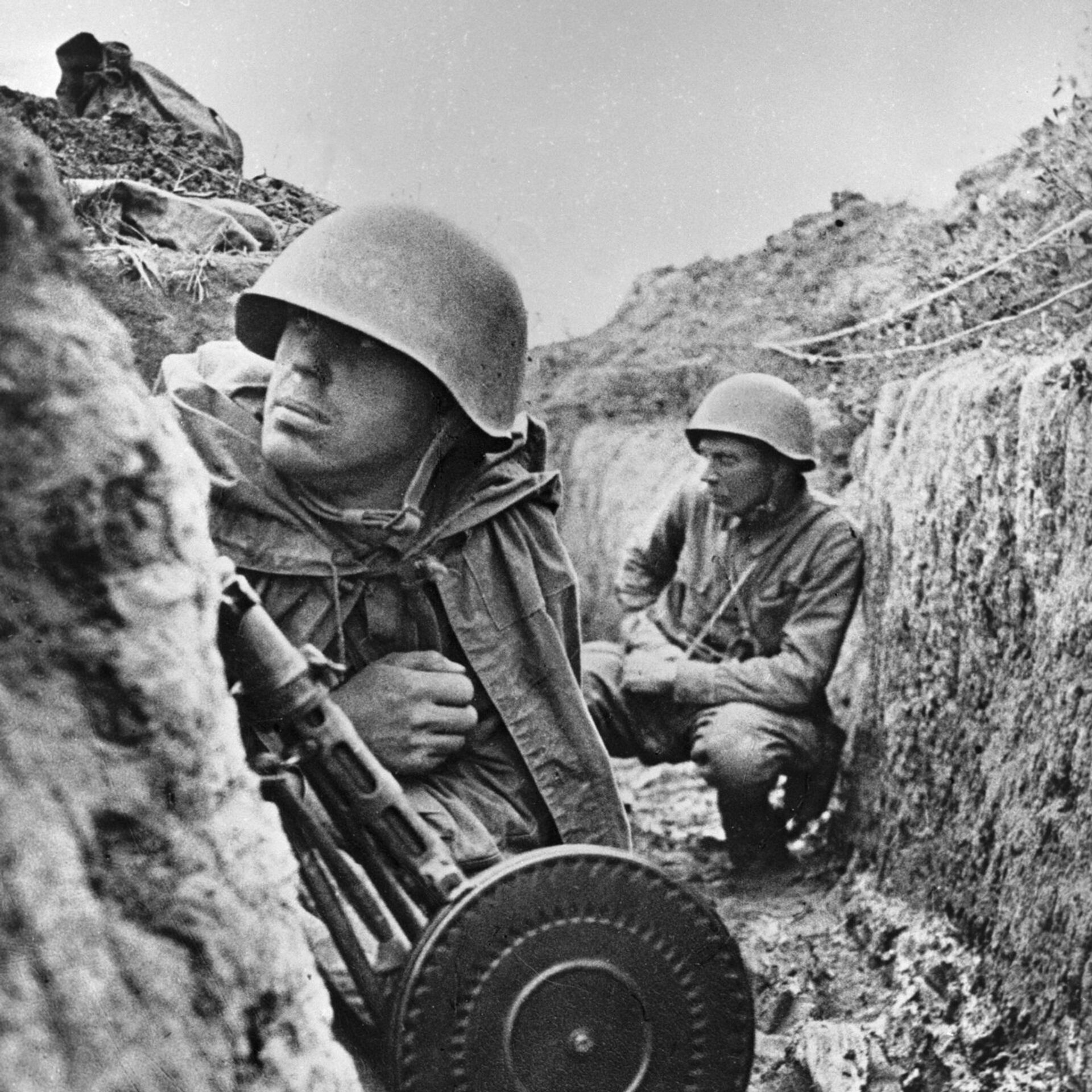
Two Soviet soldiers, one armed with a DP machine gun, in the trenches of the Leningrad Front on 1 September 1941

The Leningrad Front (initially the Leningrad Military District) was commanded by Marshal Kliment Voroshilov. It included the 23rd Army in the northern sector between the Gulf of Finland and Lake Ladoga, and the 48th Army in the western sector between the Gulf of Finland and the Slutsk–Mga position. The Leningrad Fortified Region, the Leningrad garrison, the Baltic Fleet forces, and Koporye, Pulkovo, and Slutsk–Kolpino operational groups were also present.

== Defence of civilian evacuees ==
According to Zhukov, "Before the war Leningrad had a population of 3,103,000 and 3,385,000 counting the suburbs. As many as 1,743,129, including 414,148 children were evacuated" between 29 June 1941 and 31 March 1943. They were moved to the Volga area, the Urals, Siberia and Kazakhstan.

By September 1941, the link with the Volkhov Front (commanded by Kirill Meretskov) was severed and the defensive sectors were held by four armies: 23rd Army in the northern sector, 42nd Army in the western sector, 55th Army in the southern sector, and the 67th Army in the eastern sector. The 8th Army of the Volkhov Front had the responsibility of maintaining the logistic route to the city in coordination with the Ladoga Flotilla. Air cover for the city was provided by the Leningrad military district PVO Corps and Baltic Fleet naval aviation units.

The defensive operation to protect the 1,400,000 civilian evacuees was part of the Leningrad counter-siege operations under the command of Andrei Zhdanov, Kliment Voroshilov, and Aleksei Kuznetsov. Additional military operations were carried out in coordination with Baltic Fleet naval forces under the general command of Admiral Vladimir Tributs. The Ladoga Flotilla under the command of V. Baranovsky, S.V. Zemlyanichenko, P.A. Traynin, and B.V. Khoroshikhin also played a major military role in helping with evacuation of the civilians.

=== Bombardment ===
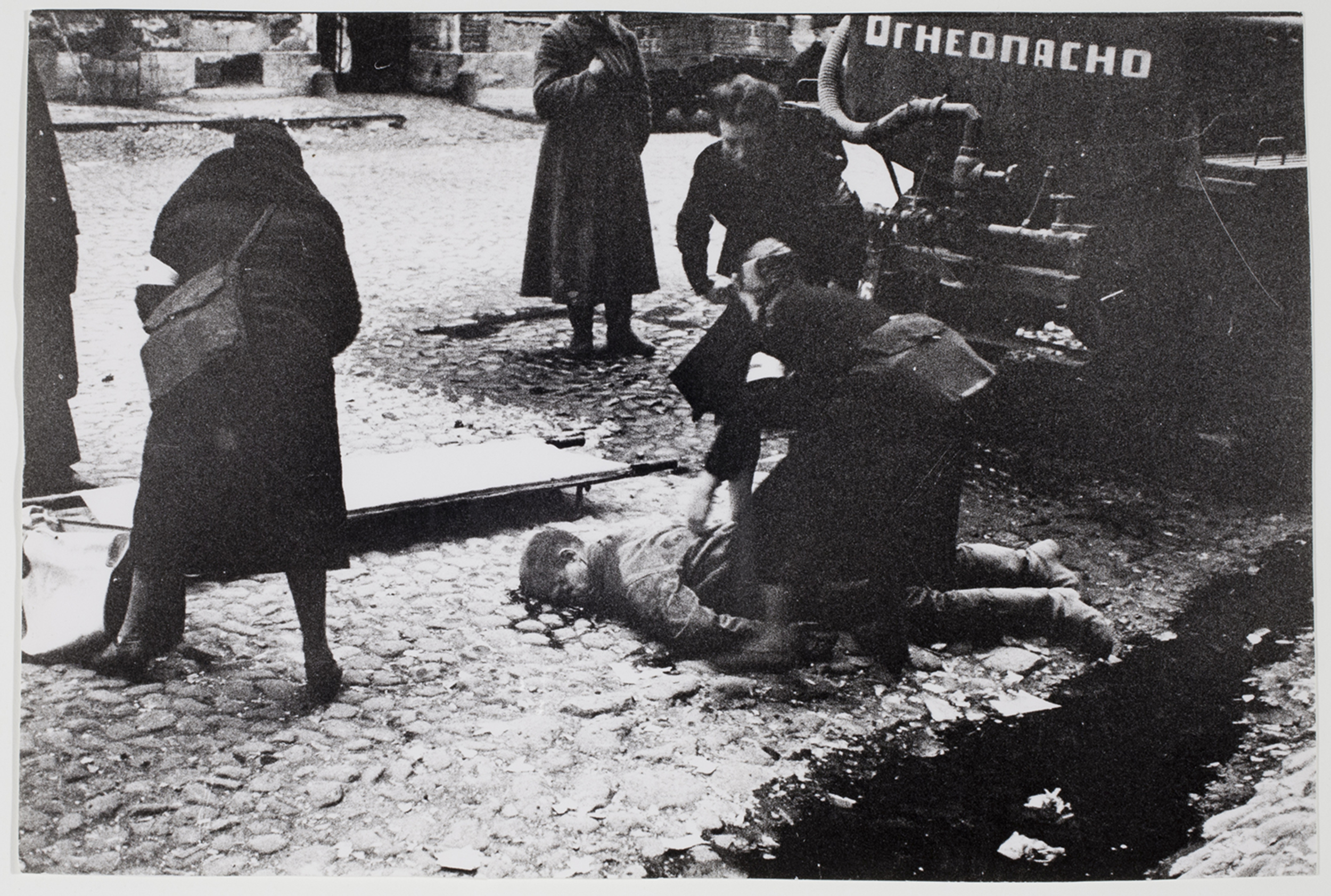
Nurses helping wounded people during a German bombardment on 10 September 1941

The first success of the Leningrad air defence took place on the night of 23 June. A Ju 88A bomber from the 1st Air Corps KGr.806 was damaged by the AA fire of the 15th Battery of the 192nd Anti-Aircraft Artillery Regiment, and made an emergency landing. All crew members, including the commander, Lieutenant Hans Turmeyer, were captured on the ground. The commander of the 15th Battery, Lieutenant Alexey Pimchenkov, was awarded the Order of the Red Banner.

By 8 September, German forces had largely surrounded the city, cutting off all supply routes to Leningrad and its suburbs. Unable to press home their offensive, and facing defences of the city organised by Marshal Zhukov, the Axis armies laid siege to the city for "900 days and nights".

The air attack of 19 September was particularly brutal. It was the heaviest air raid Leningrad suffered during the war, as 276 German bombers hit the city, killing 1,000 civilians. Many of those killed were recuperating from battle wounds in hospitals hit by German bombs. Six air raids occurred that day. Five hospitals were damaged in the bombings, as was the city's largest shopping bazaar. Hundreds of people had run from the street into the store to take shelter from the raid.

Artillery bombardment of Leningrad began in August, increasing in intensity during 1942 with the arrival of new equipment. It intensified further in 1943, when several times as many shells and bombs were used. Against this, the Soviet Baltic Fleet navy aviation made over 100,000 air missions to support their military operations during the siege. German shelling and bombing killed 5,723 and wounded 20,507 civilians in Leningrad during the siege.

=== Supplying the defenders ===
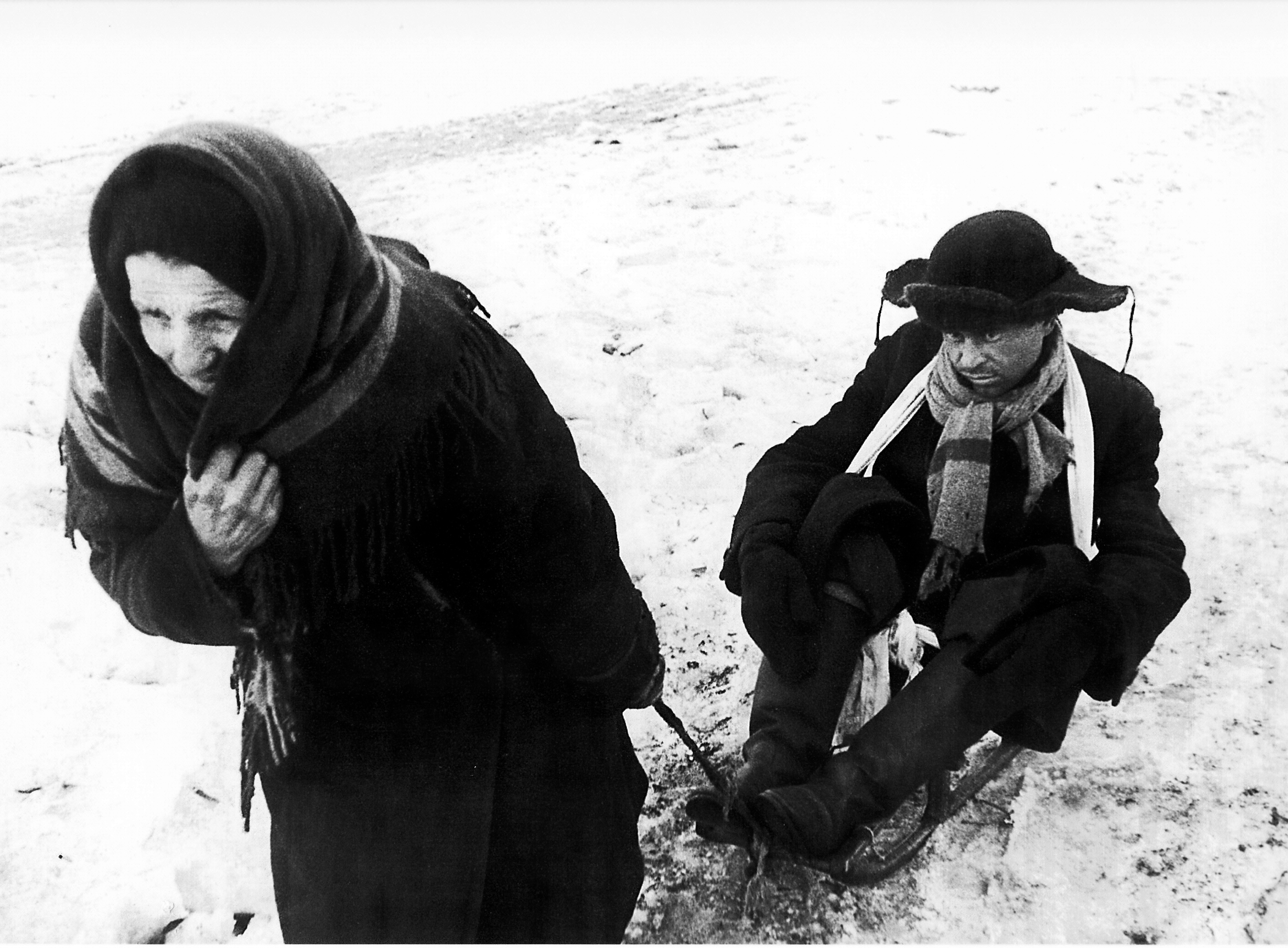
An elderly woman drags a starving man during the siege, 7 February 1942, photo by Izrail Ozersky

To sustain the defence of the city, it was vitally important for the Red Army to establish a route for bringing a constant flow of supplies into Leningrad. This route, which became known as the Road of Life (Russian: Дорога жизни), was effected over the southern part of Lake Ladoga and the corridor of land unoccupied by Axis forces between Lake Ladoga and Leningrad. Transport across Lake Ladoga was achieved by watercraft during the warmer months and land vehicles driven over thick ice in winter (hence the route becoming known as the "Ice Road"). The supply route's security was ensured by the Ladoga Flotilla, the Leningrad PVO Corps, and route security troops. Vital food supplies were thus transported to the village of Osinovets, from where they were transferred and transported over 45 km (28 mi) via a small suburban railway to Leningrad. The route was also used to evacuate civilians, since no evacuation plans had been executed in the chaos of the first winter of the war, and the city was completely isolated until 20 November, when the ice road over Lake Ladoga became operational. Vehicles risked becoming stuck in the snow or sinking through broken ice caused by constant German bombardments, but the road brought necessary military and food supplies and took civilians and wounded soldiers out, allowing the city to continue resisting the enemy.

== Effect on the city ==
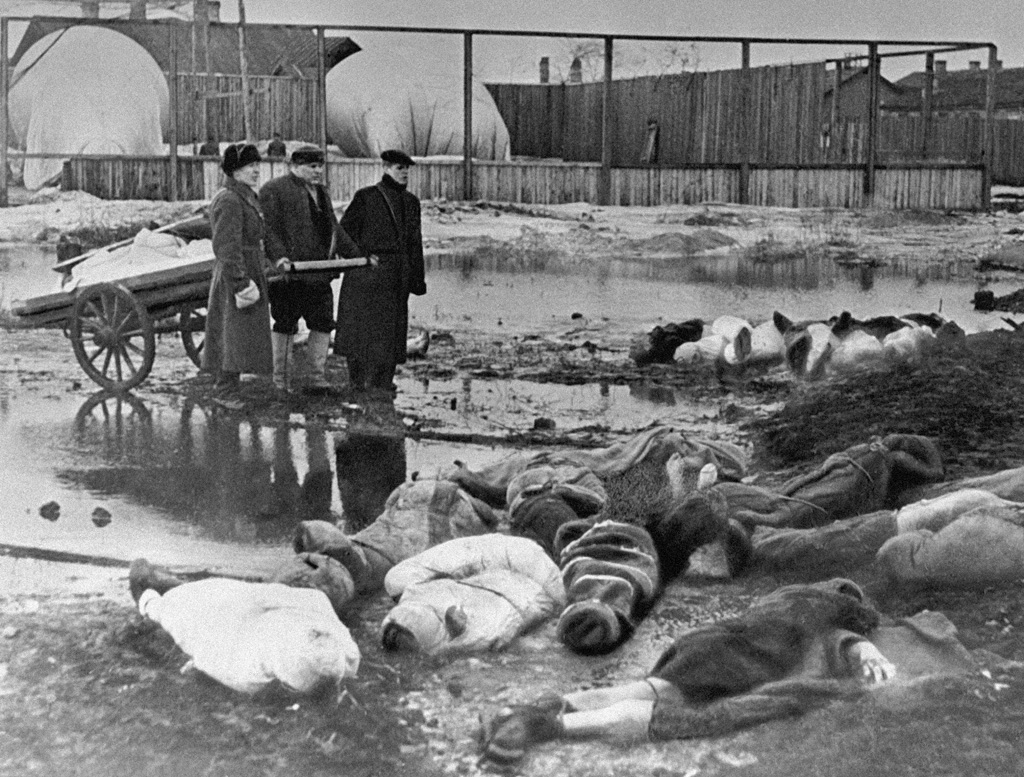
Three men burying victims of Leningrad's siege in 1942

The two-and-a-half-year siege caused the greatest destruction and largest loss of life ever known in a modern city. On Hitler's orders the Wehrmacht looted and then destroyed most of the imperial palaces, such as the Catherine Palace, Peterhof Palace, Ropsha, Strelna, Gatchina, and other historic landmarks outside the city's defensive perimeter. Many art collections were transported to Germany. Many factories, schools, hospitals and other civil infrastructure were destroyed by air raids and long-range artillery bombardment.

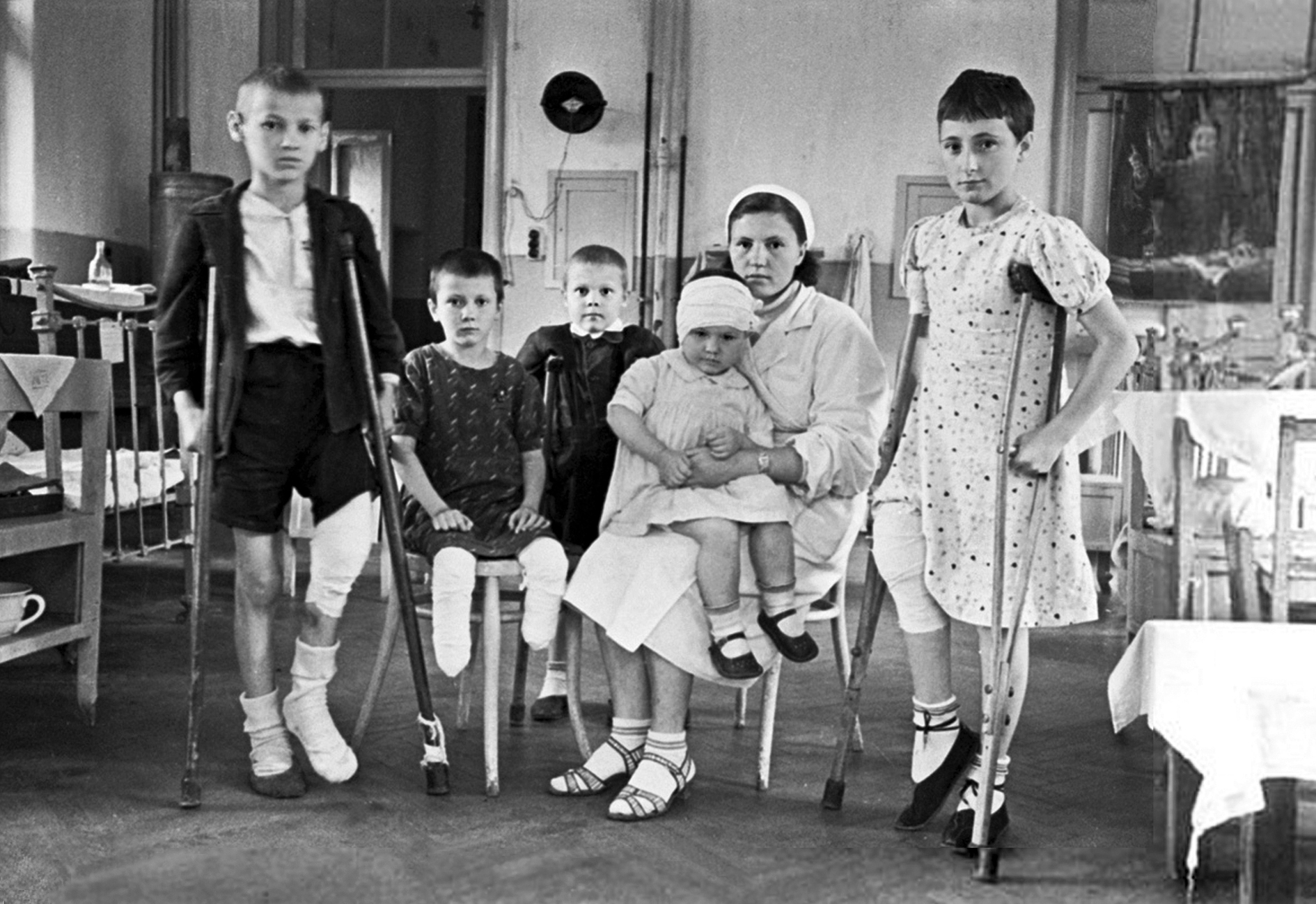
Children crippled by German shells in the Leningrad Pediatric Medical Institute

The 872 days of the siege caused extreme famine in the Leningrad region through disruption of utilities, water, energy and food supplies. This resulted in the deaths of up to 1,500,000 soldiers and civilians and the evacuation of 1,400,000 more (mainly women and children), many of whom died during evacuation due to starvation and bombardment. According to journalist Harrison Salisbury, "A total for Leningrad and vicinity of something over 1,000,000 deaths attributable to hunger, and an over-all total of deaths, civilian and military, on the order of 1,300,000 to 1,500,000 seems reasonable." According to military historian David M. Glantz, "the number of soldiers and civilians who perished during the Battle for Leningrad amounted to the awesome total of between 1.6 and two million souls. These figures associated with the defence of a single city are six times greater than the United States' total death toll during the entirety of World War II"; and "In terms of drama, symbolism and sheer human suffering, the Battle for Leningrad has no peer either in the Great Patriotic War or in any other modern war". Military historian Victor Davis Hanson affirms that "Leningrad was civilization's most lethal siege" and that "More than one million died at Leningrad amid mass starvation, epidemic, cannibalism and daily barrages – a greater death toll than any siege in history". The crippling starvation and famine extended beyond Leningrad itself, affecting the surrounding satellite cities as well and de facto including them into the blockade dynamics. The city of Pushkin, half under formal German occupation and half serving as a de facto frontline, experienced similar conditions to Leningrad's. Pushkinites died of mass hunger, the city was regularly shelled by Soviet forces, and the Germans did not introduce ration cards for bread until the summer of 1942.

Piskaryovskoye Memorial Cemetery in Leningrad holds half a million civilian victims of the siege alone. Economic destruction and human losses in Leningrad on both sides exceeded those of the Battle of Stalingrad, the Battle of Moscow, or the bombing of Tokyo. The siege of Leningrad ranks as the most lethal siege in world history, and some historians speak of the siege operations in terms of genocide, as a "racially motivated starvation policy" that became an integral part of the unprecedented German war of extermination against Soviet populations generally.

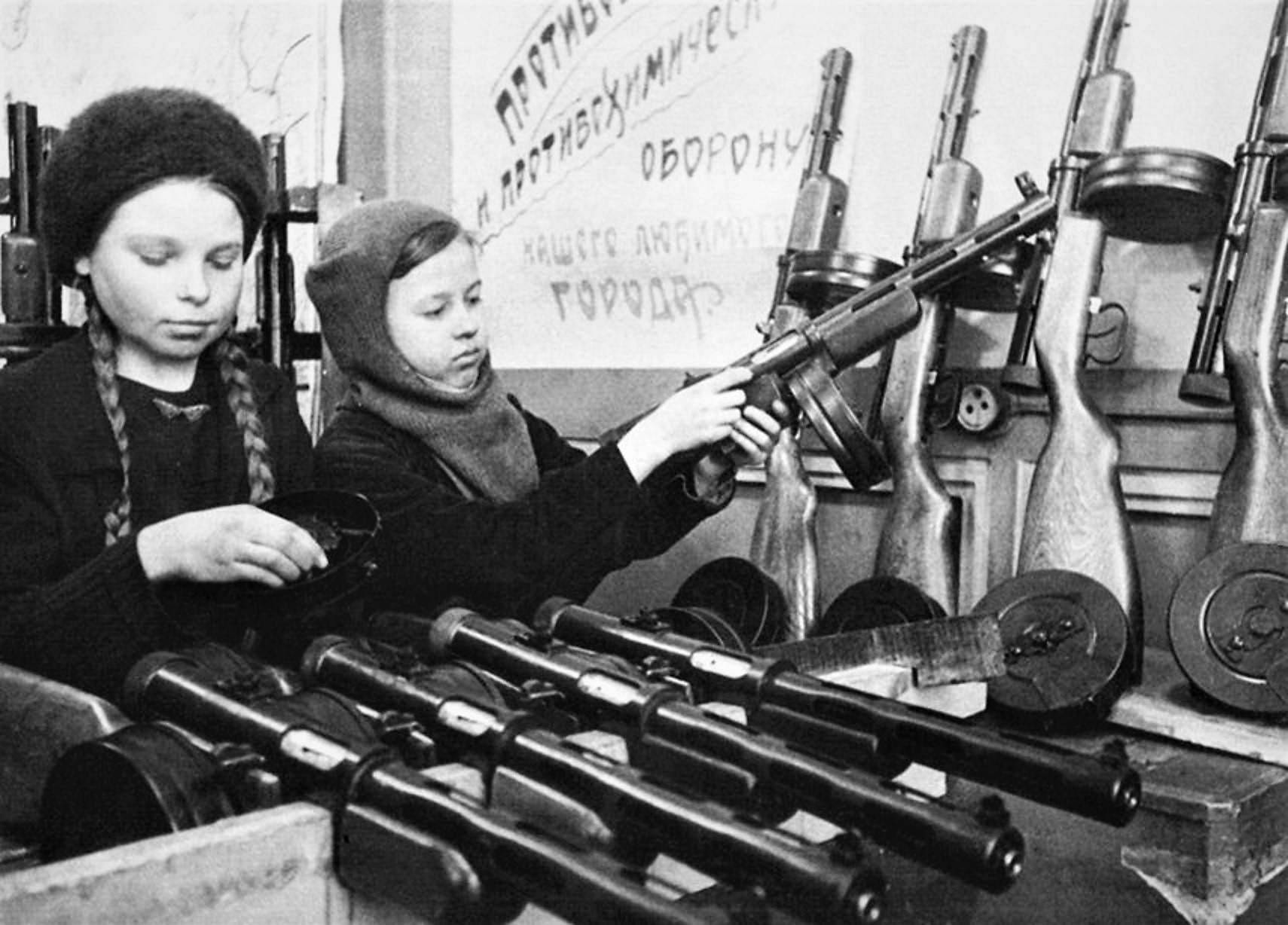
Two teen girls assemble PPD-40 submachine guns during the siege of Leningrad in 1942

Civilians in the city suffered extreme starvation, especially in the winter of 1941–42. From November 1941 to February 1942 the only food available to the citizen was 125 grams of bread per day, of which 50–60% consisted of sawdust and other inedible admixtures. In conditions of extreme temperatures (down to −30 °C (−22 °F)), and with city transport out of service, even a distance of a few kilometres to a food distribution kiosk created an insurmountable obstacle for many citizens. Deaths peaked in January–February 1942 at 100,000 per month, mostly from starvation. People often died on the streets, and citizens soon became accustomed to the sight of death.

=== Cannibalism ===
While reports of cannibalism appeared in the winter of 1941–42, NKVD records on the subject were not published until 2004. Most evidence for cannibalism that surfaced before this time was anecdotal. Anna Reid points out that "for most people at the time, cannibalism was a matter of second-hand horror stories rather than direct personal experience". Indicative of Leningraders' fears at the time, police often threatened uncooperative suspects with imprisonment in a cell with cannibals. Dimitri Lazarev, a diarist during the worst moments in the Leningrad siege, recalls his daughter and niece reciting a terrifying nursery rhyme adapted from a prewar song:

Sung to the tune of Mary Had A Little Lamb

A dystrophic walked along
With a dull look
In a basket he carried a corpse's arse.
I'm having human flesh for lunch,
This piece will do!
Ugh, hungry sorrow!
And for supper, clearly
I'll need a little baby.
I'll take the neighbours',
Steal him out of his cradle.

NKVD files report the first use of human meat as food on 13 December 1941, with nine cases. A report ten days later outlines 13 cases, ranging from a mother smothering her 18-month-old to feed her three older children to a plumber killing his wife to feed his sons and nieces.

By December 1942, the NKVD had arrested 2,105 cannibals – dividing them into two legal categories: corpse-eating (трупоедства, trupoyedstvo) and person-eating (людоедства, lyudoyedstvo). The latter were usually shot while the former were sent to prison. The Soviet Criminal Code had no provision for cannibalism, so all convictions were carried out under Code Article 59–3, "special category banditry". Instances of person-eating were significantly lower than that of corpse-eating; of the 300 people arrested in April 1942 for cannibalism, only 44 were murderers. 64% of cannibals were female, 44% were unemployed, 90% were illiterate or with only basic education, 15% were rooted inhabitants, and only 2% had criminal records. More cases occurred in the outlying districts. Cannibals were often unsupported women with dependent children and no previous convictions, which allowed for a certain level of clemency in legal proceedings.

Given the scope of mass starvation, cannibalism was relatively rare. Far more common was murder for ration cards. In the first six months of 1942, Leningrad witnessed 1,216 such murders. At the same time, Leningrad was experiencing its highest mortality rate, as high as 100,000 people per month. Lisa Kirschenbaum writes that rates of cannibalism "provided an opportunity for emphasizing that the majority of Leningraders managed to maintain their cultural norms in the most unimaginable circumstances."

== Soviet relief of the siege ==
Soviet ski troops by the Hermitage Museum in Leningrad

On 9 August 1942, the Symphony No. 7 "Leningrad" by Dmitri Shostakovich was performed by the Leningrad Radio Orchestra. The concert was broadcast on loudspeakers throughout the city and also aimed at enemy lines. The same day had been previously designated by Hitler to celebrate the fall of the city with a lavish banquet at Leningrad's Astoria Hotel, and was a few days before the Sinyavino Offensive.

=== Sinyavino Offensive ===
The Sinyavino Offensive was a Soviet attempt to break the siege of the city in early autumn 1942. The 2nd Shock and the 8th armies were to link up with the forces of the Leningrad Front. At the same time the German side was preparing an offensive to capture the city, Operation Nordlicht (Northern Light), using the troops made available by the capture of Sevastopol. Neither side was aware of the other's intentions until the battle started.

The offensive began on 27 August 1942 with some small-scale attacks by the Leningrad front, pre-empting "Nordlicht" by a few weeks. The successful start of the operation forced the Germans to redirect troops from the planned "Nordlicht" to counterattack the Soviet armies. The counteroffensive saw the first deployment of the Tiger tank, though with limited success. After parts of the 2nd Shock Army were encircled and destroyed, the Soviet offensive was halted. However, the German forces also had to abandon their offensive.

=== Operation Iskra ===
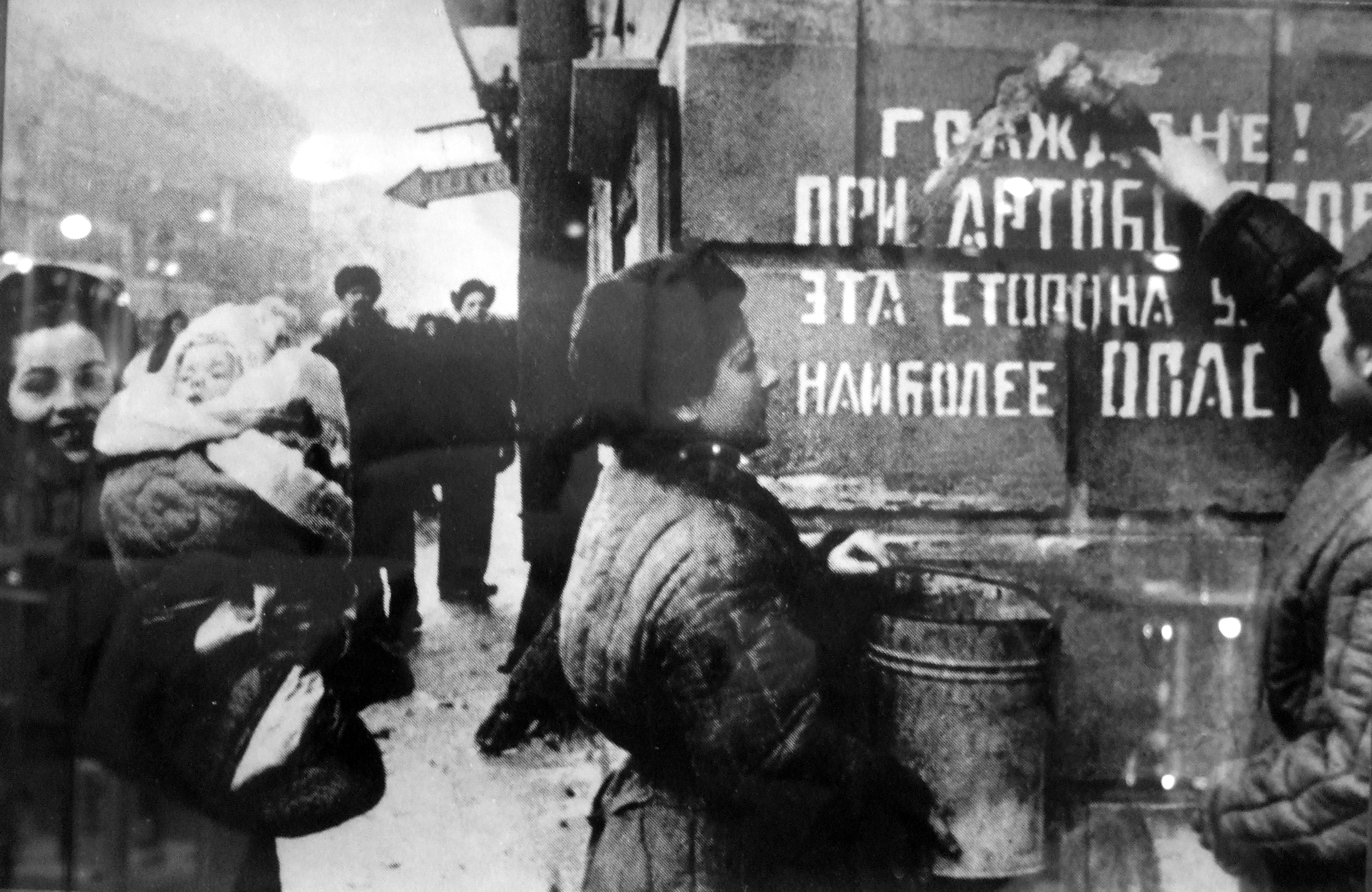
Exultant Leningrad, 1944. The sign on the wall says: Citizens! This side of the street is the most dangerous during the artillery barrage.

The encirclement was broken in the wake of Operation Iskra (Spark), a full-scale offensive conducted by the Leningrad and Volkhov Fronts. This offensive started in the morning of 12 January 1943. After fierce battles the Red Army units overcame the powerful German fortifications to the south of Lake Ladoga, and on 18 January 1943, the Volkhov Front's 372nd Rifle Division met troops of the 123rd Rifle Brigade of the Leningrad Front, opening an 8-mile wide land corridor, which could provide some relief to the besieged population of Leningrad.

The Spanish Blue Division faced a major Soviet attempt to break the siege of Leningrad in February 1943, when the 55th Army of the Soviet forces, reinvigorated after the victory at Stalingrad, attacked the Spanish positions at the Battle of Krasny Bor, near the main Moscow-Leningrad road. Despite very heavy casualties, the Spaniards were able to hold their ground against a Soviet force seven times larger and supported by tanks. The Soviet assault was contained by the Blue Division.

=== Lifting the siege ===
The siege continued until 27 January 1944, when the Soviet Leningrad–Novgorod offensive expelled German forces from the southern outskirts of the city. This was a combined effort by the Leningrad and Volkhov Fronts, along with the 1st and 2nd Baltic Fronts. The Baltic Fleet provided 30% of aviation power for the final strike against the Wehrmacht. In the summer of 1944, the Finnish Defence Forces were pushed back to the other side of the Bay of Vyborg and the Vuoksi River.

== Aftermath ==
In his analysis of the siege of Leningrad, author Robert Forczyk highlights both the strategic and operational outcomes of the German offensive against the city. Forczyk asserts that although Hitler intended to destroy Leningrad, this objective was not achieved:

Hitler had intended to demolish Leningrad as both a symbol and a centre of Soviet power, but he accomplished neither. Thus in strategic terms, the German effort against Leningrad was a failure. Yet in operational terms, the German siege of Leningrad effectively isolated three Soviet armies for over two years and forced six other armies to conduct repeated costly frontal assaults to try to end the siege. In January 1944, the Red Army had to mass the equivalent of over 60 divisions in the Leningrad-Volkhov area to dislodge 20 German divisions and still failed to encircle and destroy a single one of them. Total Soviet military casualties on the Leningrad and Volkhov fronts during the siege were at least 1.5 million, including 620,000 dead or captured. Furthermore, the siege cost the lives of about one million Soviet civilians in Leningrad and prevented the city's industries from participating fully in the Soviet war effort until mid-1944.

In spite of their operational mistakes which cost them victory at Leningrad, the German tactical performance on the defence was impressive – perhaps one of the best of the war by any army. On the 50m-high Siniavino Heights, German troops held off about 250,000 Soviet troops for 384 days and inflicted over 400,000 casualties. In comparison, German forces defending atop the 516m-high Monte Cassino massif held off 100,000 Allied troops for 123 days and inflicted about 20,000 casualties.

== Timeline ==
The timeline is based on various sources such as work done by David Glantz.

=== 1941 ===
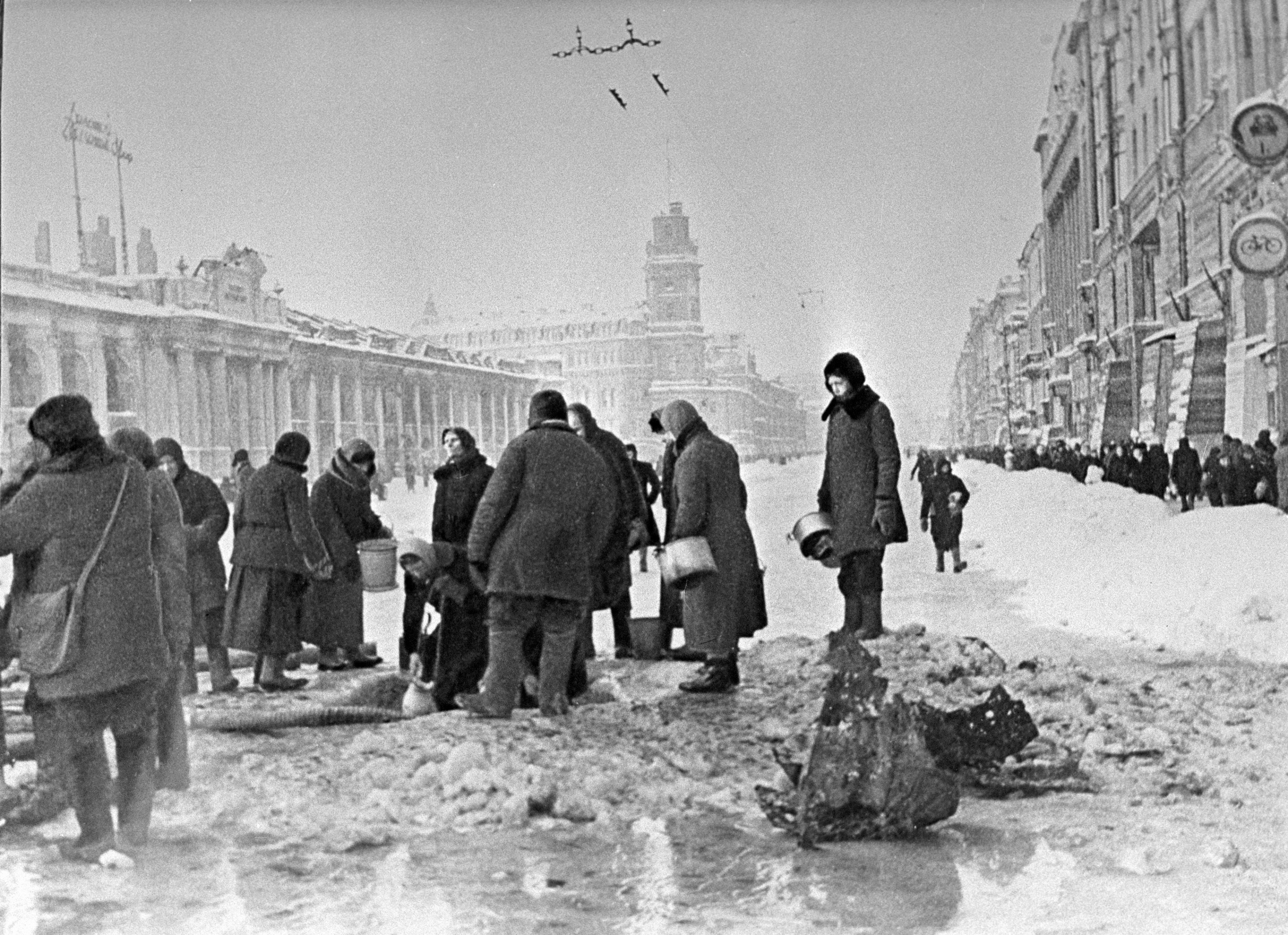
People gathering water from shell-holes on Nevsky Prospect, between Gostiny Dvor and Ostrovsky Square

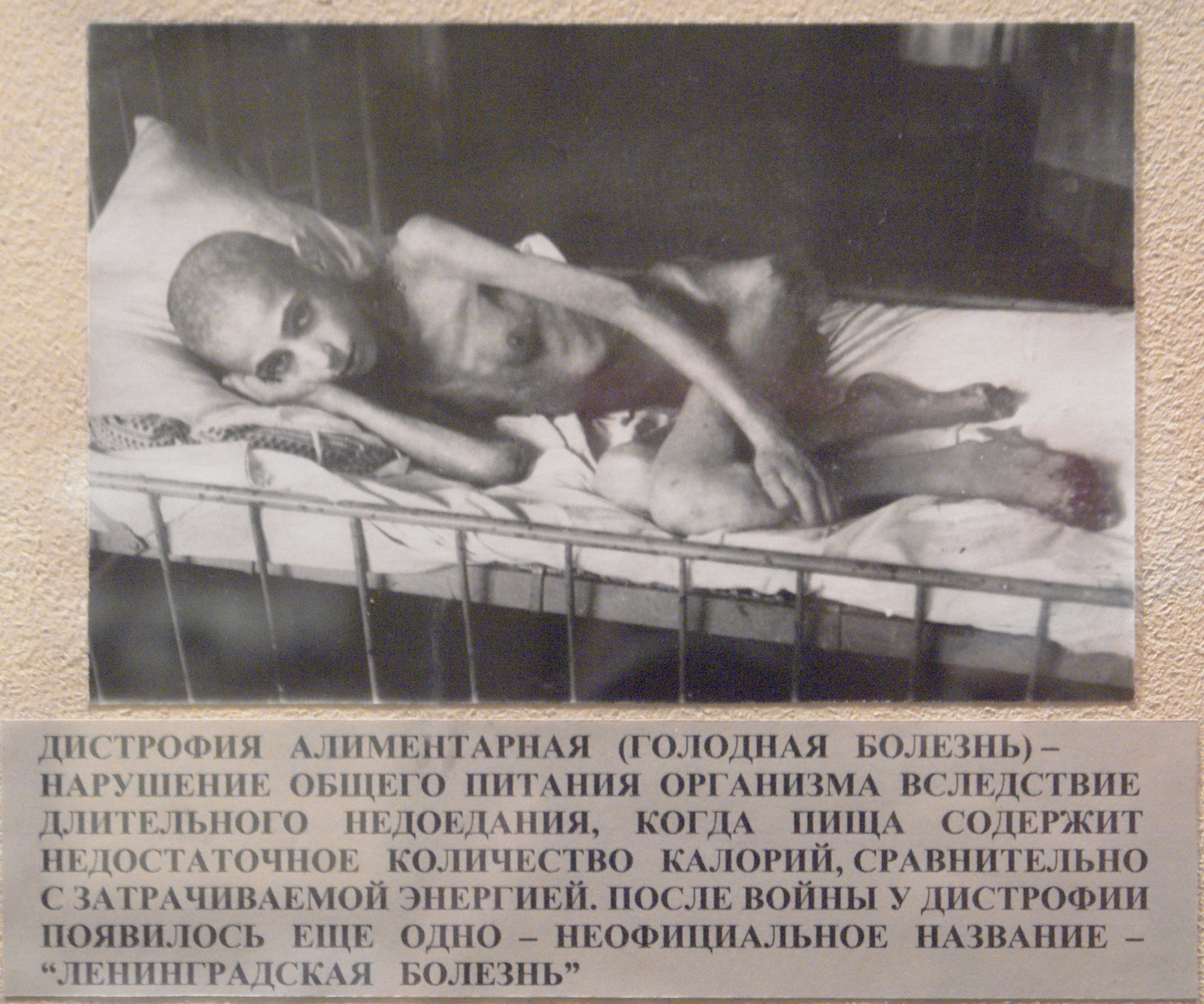
A victim of starvation in besieged Leningrad suffering from muscle atrophy in 1941

- April: Hitler intends to occupy and then destroy Leningrad, according to plan Barbarossa and Generalplan Ost.
- 22 June: The Axis powers' invasion of Soviet Union begins with Operation Barbarossa.
- 23 June: Leningrad commander M. Popov, sends his second in command to reconnoitre defensive positions south of Leningrad.
- 29 June: Construction of the Luga defence fortifications (Russian: Лужский оборонительный рубеж) begins together with evacuation of children and women.
- June–July: Over 300,000 civilian refugees from Pskov and Novgorod escaping from the advancing Germans come to Leningrad for shelter. The armies of the North-Western Front join the front lines at Leningrad. Total military strength with reserves and volunteers reaches 2 million men involved on all sides of the emerging battle.
- 19–23 July: First attack on Leningrad by Army Group North is stopped 100 km (60 mi) south of the city.
- 27 July: Hitler visits Army Group North, angry at the delay. He orders Wilhelm Ritter von Leeb to take Leningrad by December.
- 31 July: Finns attack the Soviet 23rd Army at the Karelian Isthmus, eventually reaching the northern pre-Winter War Finnish-Soviet border.
- 20 August – 8 September: Artillery bombardments of Leningrad hit industries, schools, hospitals and civilian houses.
- 21 August: Hitler's Directive No. 34 orders "Encirclement of Leningrad in conjunction with the Finns."
- 20–27 August: Evacuation of civilians is blocked by attacks on railways and other exits from Leningrad.
- 31 August: Finnish forces go on the defensive and straighten their front line. This involves crossing the 1939 pre-Winter War border and occupation of municipalities of Kirjasalo and Beloostrov.
- 6 September: German High Command's Alfred Jodl fails to persuade Finns to continue offensive against Leningrad.
- 2–9 September: Finns capture the Beloostrov and Kirjasalo salients and conduct defensive preparations.
- 8 September: Land encirclement of Leningrad is completed when the German forces reach the shores of Lake Ladoga.
- 10 September: Joseph Stalin appoints General Zhukov to replace Marshal Voroshilov as Leningrad Front and Baltic Fleet commander.
- 12 September: The largest food depot in Leningrad, the Badajevski General Store, is destroyed by a German bomb.
- 15 September: Wilhelm Ritter von Leeb has to remove the 4th Panzer Group from the front lines and transfer it to Army Group Center for the Moscow offensive.
- 19 September: German troops are stopped 10 km (6 mi) from Leningrad. Citizens join the fighting at the defence line.
- 22 September: Hitler directs that "Saint Petersburg must be erased from the face of the Earth".
- 22 September: Hitler declares, "we have no interest in saving lives of the civilian population."
- 8 November: Hitler states in a speech at Munich: "Leningrad must die of starvation."
- 10 November: Soviet counterattack begins, and lasts until 30 December.
- December: Winston Churchill wrote in his diary, "Leningrad is encircled, but not taken."
- 6 December: The United Kingdom declared war on Finland. This was followed by declarations of war by Canada, Australia, India and New Zealand.
- 30 December: Soviet counterattack, which began on 10 November, forced Germans to retreat from Tikhvin to the Volkhov River, preventing them from joining Finnish forces stationed at the Svir River on the eastern shore of Lake Ladoga.

=== 1942 ===
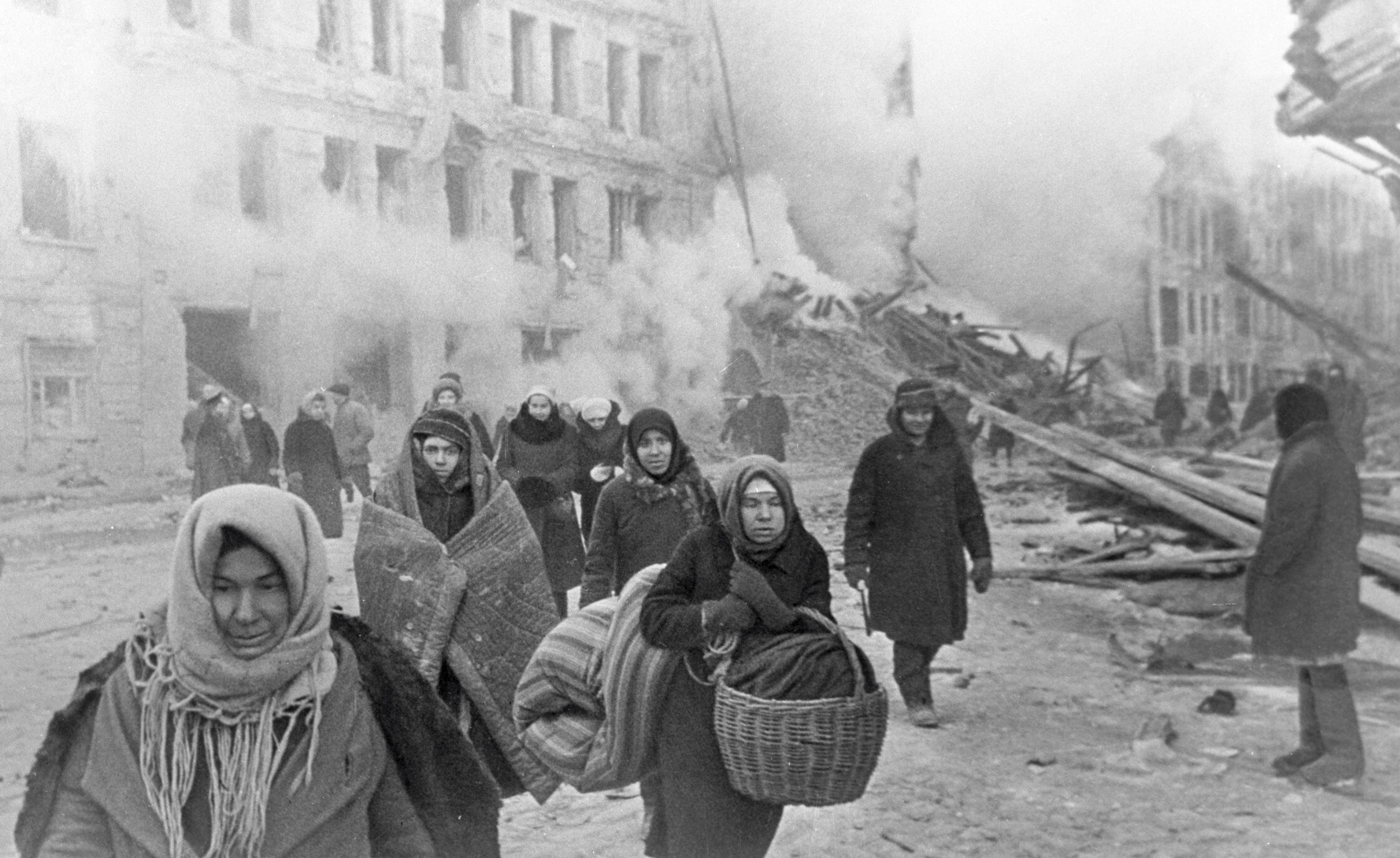
Soviet civilians leaving destroyed houses after a German bombardment during the siege, 10 December 1942

- 7 January: Soviet Lyuban Offensive Operation is launched; it lasts 16 weeks and is unsuccessful, resulting in the loss of the 2nd Shock Army.
- January: Soviets launch battle for the Nevsky Pyatachok bridgehead in an attempt to break the siege. This battle lasts until May 1943, but is only partially successful. Very heavy casualties are experienced by both sides.
- 4–30 April: Luftwaffe Operation Eisstoß (ice impact) fails to sink Baltic Fleet ships iced in at Leningrad.
- June–September: New German railway-mounted artillery bombards Leningrad with 800 kg (1,800 lb) shells.
- August: The Spanish Blue Division (División Azul) transferred to Leningrad.
- 9 August 1942: The Symphony No. 7 "Leningrad" by Dmitri Shostakovich was performed in the city.
- 14 August – 27 October: Naval Detachment K clashes with Leningrad supply route on Lake Ladoga.
- 19 August: Soviets begin an eight-week-long Sinyavino Offensive, which fails to lift the siege, but thwarts German offensive plans (Operation Nordlicht).

=== 1943 ===
- January–December: Increased artillery bombardments of Leningrad.
- 12–30 January: Operation Iskra penetrates the siege by opening a land corridor along the coast of Lake Ladoga into the city. The siege is broken.
- 10 February – 1 April: The unsuccessful Operation Polyarnaya Zvezda attempts to lift the siege.

=== 1944 ===
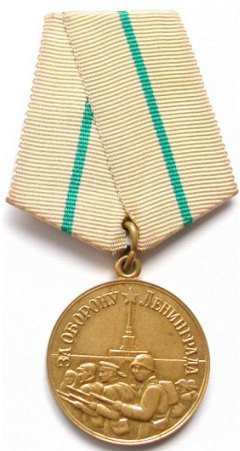
1,496,000 Soviet personnel were awarded the Medal "For the Defence of Leningrad" from 22 December 1942

- 14 January – 1 March: Several Soviet offensive operations begin, aimed at ending the siege.
- 27 January: Siege of Leningrad ends. German forces pushed 60–100 km (37–62 mi) away from the city.
- January: Before retreating, the German armies loot and destroy the historical Palaces of the Tsars, such as the Catherine Palace, the Peterhof Palace, the Gatchina Palace and the Strelna Palace. Many other historic landmarks and homes in the suburbs of St. Petersburg are looted and then destroyed, and a large number of valuable art collections are moved to Germany.

During the siege some 3,200 residential buildings and 9,000 wooden houses were burned, and 840 factories and plants were destroyed in Leningrad and suburbs.

== Later evaluation ==
=== Legality ===
The judges at the High Command trial – a United States military court convened to judge German war crimes – ruled that the siege of Leningrad was not criminal: "the cutting off every source of sustenance from without is deemed legitimate. ... We might wish the law were otherwise, but we must administer it as we find it". Even such actions as killing civilians fleeing the siege was ruled to be legal during the trial. The Soviet Union was not successful at banning the use of starvation in the 1949 Geneva Convention; though imposing some limits, it "accepted the legality of starvation as a weapon of war in principle". Starvation was criminalized later in the twentieth century.

=== Genocide ===
Some 21st century historians, including Timo Vihavainen and Nikita Lomagin, have classified the siege of Leningrad as genocide due to the systematic starvation and intentional destruction of the city's civilian population. On 18 March 2024, the Russian foreign ministry issued a statement via TASS to the German foreign ministry saying that the siege of Leningrad was a genocide.

=== Controversial issues ===
==== Controversy over Finnish participation ====
Almost all Finnish historians regard the siege as a German operation and do not consider that the Finns effectively participated in it. Russian historian Nikolai Baryshnikov argues that active Finnish participation did occur, but most other historians have been silent about it, most likely due to the friendly nature of postwar Soviet–Finnish relations.

The main facts counting in favour of the former view are: (a) the Finns mostly stayed at the pre-Winter War border at the Karelian Isthmus (with small exceptions to straighten the frontline), despite German wishes and requests, and (b) they did not bombard the city from planes or with artillery and did not allow the Germans to bring their own land forces to Finnish lines. Baryshnikov explains that the Finnish military in the region was strategically dependent on the Germans, and lacked the required means and will to press the attack against Leningrad any further.

==== Soviet deportation of civilians with ethnic origins in enemy nations – Germans and Finns ====
Deportations of Soviets with Finnish and German descent from the Leningrad area to inhospitable areas of the Soviet Union began in March 1942 using the Road of Life; many of their descendants remain in those areas. The situation in besieged Leningrad was worse than that in the eastern areas to which most Leningrad residents were evacuated. These inhospitable areas of the Soviet Union hosted millions of evacuees, and many factories, universities, and theatres were also relocated there.

== Commemoration ==
=== Leningrad Siege and Defence Museum ===
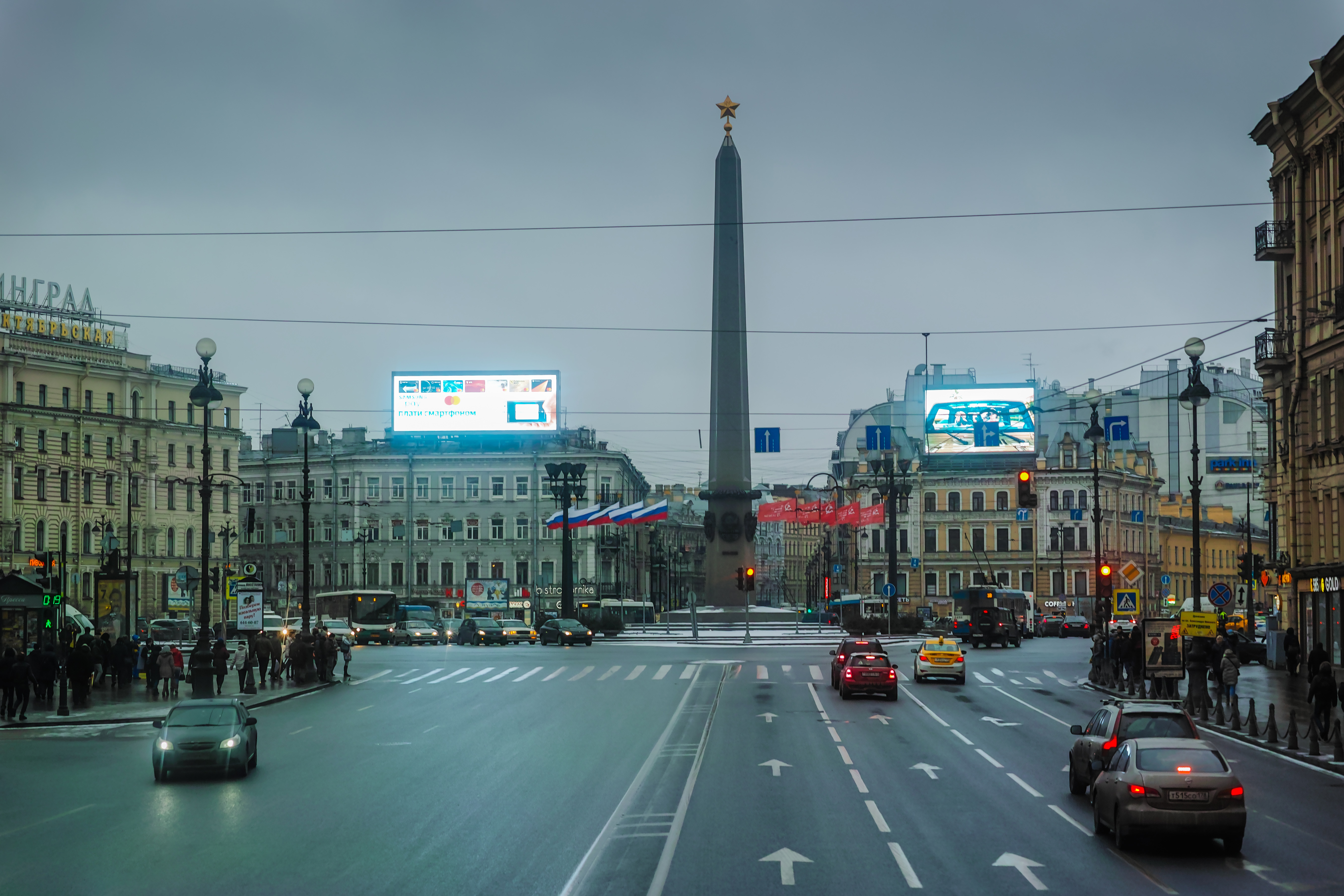
Hero-City Obelisk

Even during the siege, war artifacts were collected and shown to the public by city authorities, such as the German aeroplane that was shot down and fell to the ground in Tauricheskiy Garden (Таврический сад). Such objects were displayed as a sign of the people's courage and gathered in a specially allocated building of the former 19th century Solyanoi Town. The exhibition soon turned into a full-scale State Memorial Museum of the Defence and Siege of Leningrad (Государственный мемориальный музей обороны и блокады Ленинграда).

Several years after World War II, from the late 1940s to the early 1950s, Stalin's supposed jealousy of Leningrad city leaders caused their destruction in the course of politically motivated show trials forming the post-WWII Leningrad Affair (the pre-war purge followed the 1934 assassination of the popular city ruler Sergey Kirov). Another generation of state and Communist Party functionaries of the city was wiped out, supposedly for publicly overestimating the importance of the city as an independent fighting unit and their own roles in defeating the enemy. Their brainchild, the Leningrad Defence Museum, was also destroyed, as were many valuable exhibits.

With the museum's revival during the wave of glasnost of the late 1980s new shocking facts were published, showing heroism of the wartime city along with hardships and even cruelties of the period. The exhibition opened in its originally allocated building, but has not yet regained its original size and area, most of its former premises having been occupied by military and other governmental offices. Plans for a new modern building of the museum were suspended due to the 2008 financial crisis, although under the present Defence Secretary, Sergey Shoigu, promises have been made to expand the museum at its original location.

=== Monuments: The Green Belt of Glory and memorial cemeteries ===
Commemoration of the siege got a second wind during the 1960s. Local artists dedicated their achievements to the Victory and memory of the war they saw. The local poet and war participant Mikhail Dudin suggested erecting a ring of monuments on the places of heaviest siege-time fighting and linking them into a belt of gardens around the city showing where the advancing enemy armies were stopped forever. That was the beginning of the Green Belt of Glory (Зелёный пояс Славы).

On 29 October 1966, a monument entitled Broken Ring (of the Siege, Разорванное кольцо) was erected at the 40th kilometre of the Road of Life, on the shore of Lake Ladoga near the village of Kokkorevo. Designed and created by Konstantin Simun, the monument pays tribute not only to the lives saved via the frozen Ladoga, but also the many lives broken by the siege.

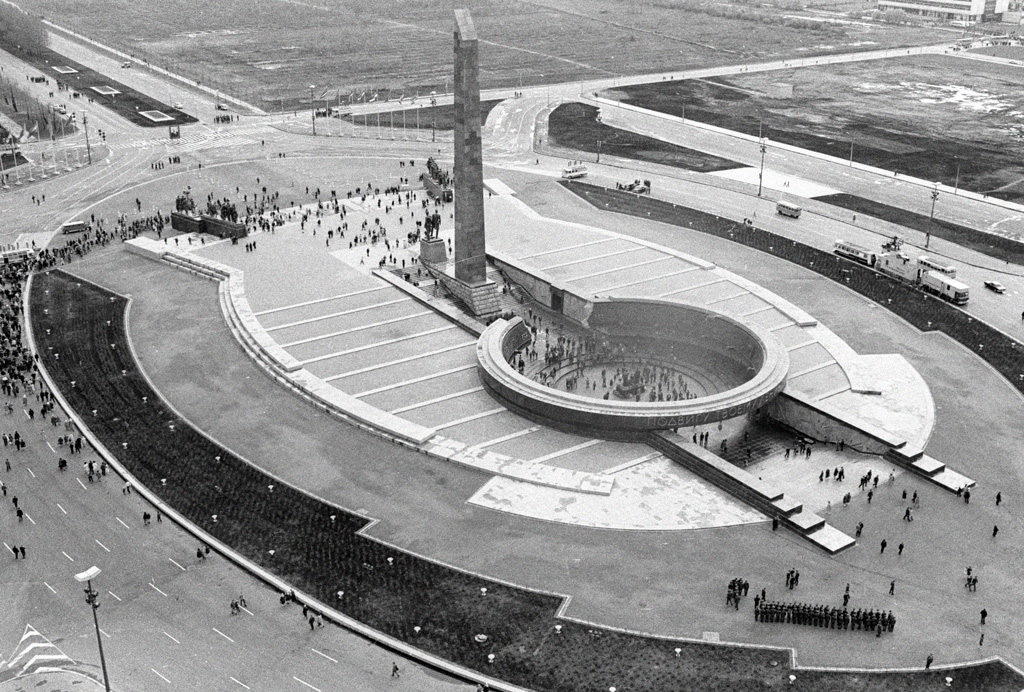
Monument to the Heroic Defenders of Leningrad in Ploschad' Pobedy (Victory Square), southern entrance to the city, 1981

The Monument to the Heroic Defenders of Leningrad on Victory Square (Монумент героическим защитникам Ленинграда) was erected on 9 May 1975 in Victory Square, Saint Petersburg.

The monument is a huge bronze ring with a gap in it, pointing toward the site where the Soviets eventually broke through the encircling German forces. In the centre a Russian mother cradles her dying soldier son. The monument has an inscription saying "900 days 900 nights". An exhibit underneath the monument contains artifacts from this period, such as journals.

==== Memorial cemeteries ====
During the siege, numerous deaths of civilians and soldiers led to considerable expansion of burial places later memorialised, of which the best known is Piskaryovskoye Memorial Cemetery.

=== Military parade on Palace Square ===
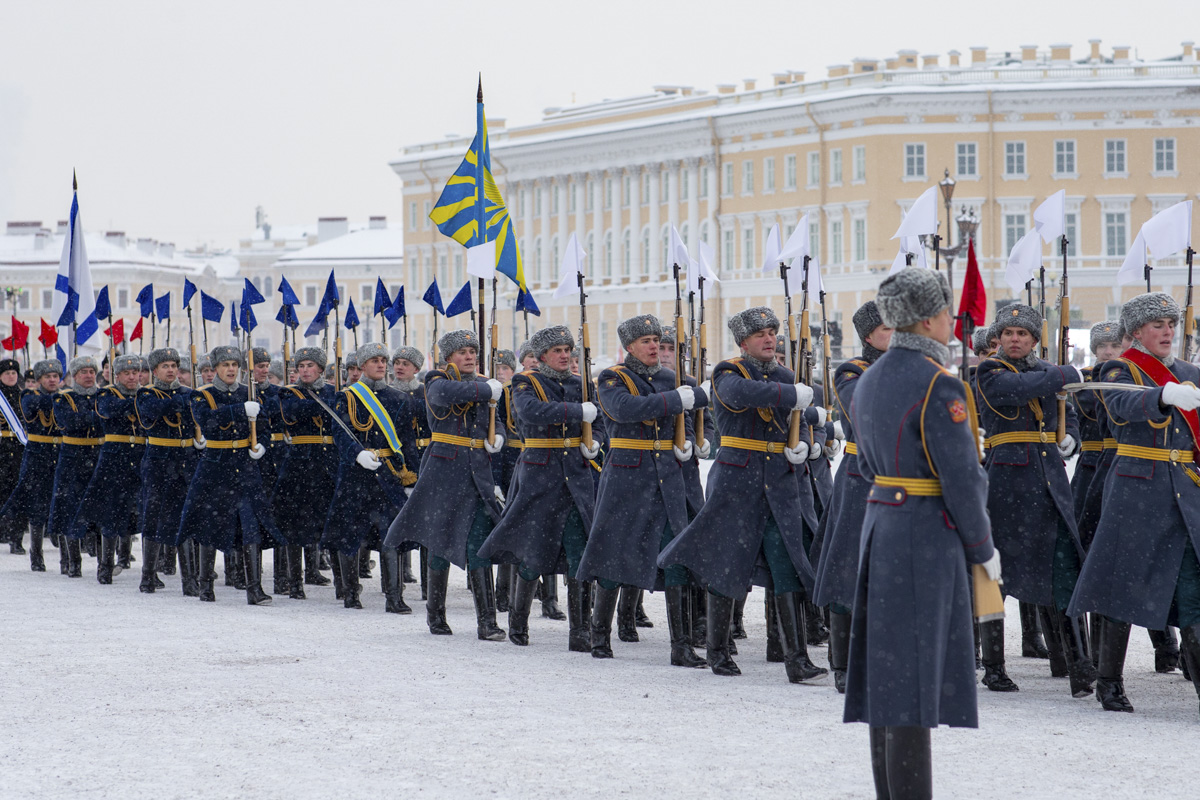
Personnel from the 154th Preobrazhensky Independent Commandant's Regiment on Palace Square, 27 January 2019

Every year, on 27 January, as part of the celebrations of the lifting of the siege, a military parade of the troops of the Western Military District and the Saint Petersburg Garrison on Palace Square takes place. Close to 3,000 soldiers and cadets take part in the parade, which includes historical reenactors in Red Army uniforms, wartime tanks such as the T-34 and color guards carrying wartime flags such as the Banner of Victory and the standards of the different military fronts. Musical support is provided by the Massed Military Bands of the St. Petersburg Garrison under the direction of the Senior Director of Music of the Military Band of the Western Military District.

== See also ==
- Consequences of Nazism
- Drang nach Osten
- Droughts and famines in Russia and the Soviet Union
- Hunger Plan
- List of ethnic cleansing campaigns
- List of famines
- List of genocides
- New Order (Nazism)
- Ribbon of Leningrad Victory
- Soviet Union in World War II
- Victims of Nazi Germany
- War crimes in World War II
- World War II casualties
- World War II casualties of the Soviet Union
