= Ribbon of Leningrad Victory =

The ribbon used by the campaign

The Ribbon of Leningrad Victory (Russian: Ленточка Ленинградской Победы, romanized: Lentochka Leningradskoi Pobedy) was a campaign launched in Saint Petersburg on 18 January 2009, part of a citywide celebration of the 65th anniversary of the liberation of the city, then known as Leningrad, from the Nazi Army during World War II.

The design of the ribbon distributed by the campaign was inspired by the Defense of Leningrad medal awarded to members of the Soviet Armed Forces who participated in the city's defense. Each ribbon cost the city 3.5 Russian rubles; organizers handed out a million of them free of cost. Ribbons were distributed on 26 and 27 January in Sberbank branches, post offices, and twelve central underground stations. Additionally, ribbons were given to participants in several events commemorating the anniversary of the siege, such as a concert in the Ice Palace.

The olive green of the ribbon was inspired by the same colour on the army's Medal "For the Defence of Leningrad".

Further distributions of ribbons were made for the 70th and 75th anniversaries, with 1.5 million distributed on the latter occasion (2019).

== See also ==
- Effect of the Siege of Leningrad on the city
- Hero-City Obelisk
- Piskaryovskoye Memorial Cemetery
- Ribbon of Saint George
