= Izrail Ozersky =

Russian war photographer (1917–1971)

- Израиль Озерский
- Born: March 28, 1917; Pochinok, Russian Empire
- Died: 1971 (aged 53–54); Moscow, Russia
- Occupation: Photojournalism

Izrail Abramovich Ozersky (Russian: Израиль Абрамович Озерский; March 28, 1904, Pochinkovsky, Smolensk Governorate – 1971) was a Russian war photographer working for RIA Novosti. His photograph The Work of a Soldier became a classic of Soviet war documentary photography.

== Biography ==
Izrail Abramovich Ozersky was born on March 28, 1904 in Pochinkovsky, Smolensk Oblast. He first worked as a welder. He then learned the craft of photography and in the 1930s began working at the Soyuzfoto agency. During the Great Patriotic War, he was a correspondent for the TASS photo chronicle. He took documentary photographs on the North Caucasian, Crimean, Northwestern and Ukrainian fronts. His photograph Soldier's Work became a classic of Soviet war documentary photography. In the post-war period, he worked as a photojournalist at Exhibition of Achievements of National Economy, at the Novosti news agency.

In October 1926, he joined the military service, according to documents he served as a military engineer of the 3rd rank; captain; reserve lieutenant and lieutenant. He was known for his photographs of the Great Patriotic War.

== Gallery ==
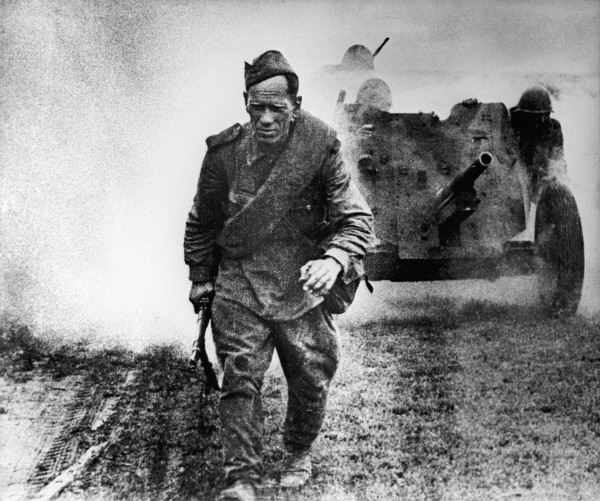
Soldier's work, a soldier walks along the road, behind him artillery raises clouds of dust and pushes a 45 mm anti-tank gun, Russia, August 1, 1943.

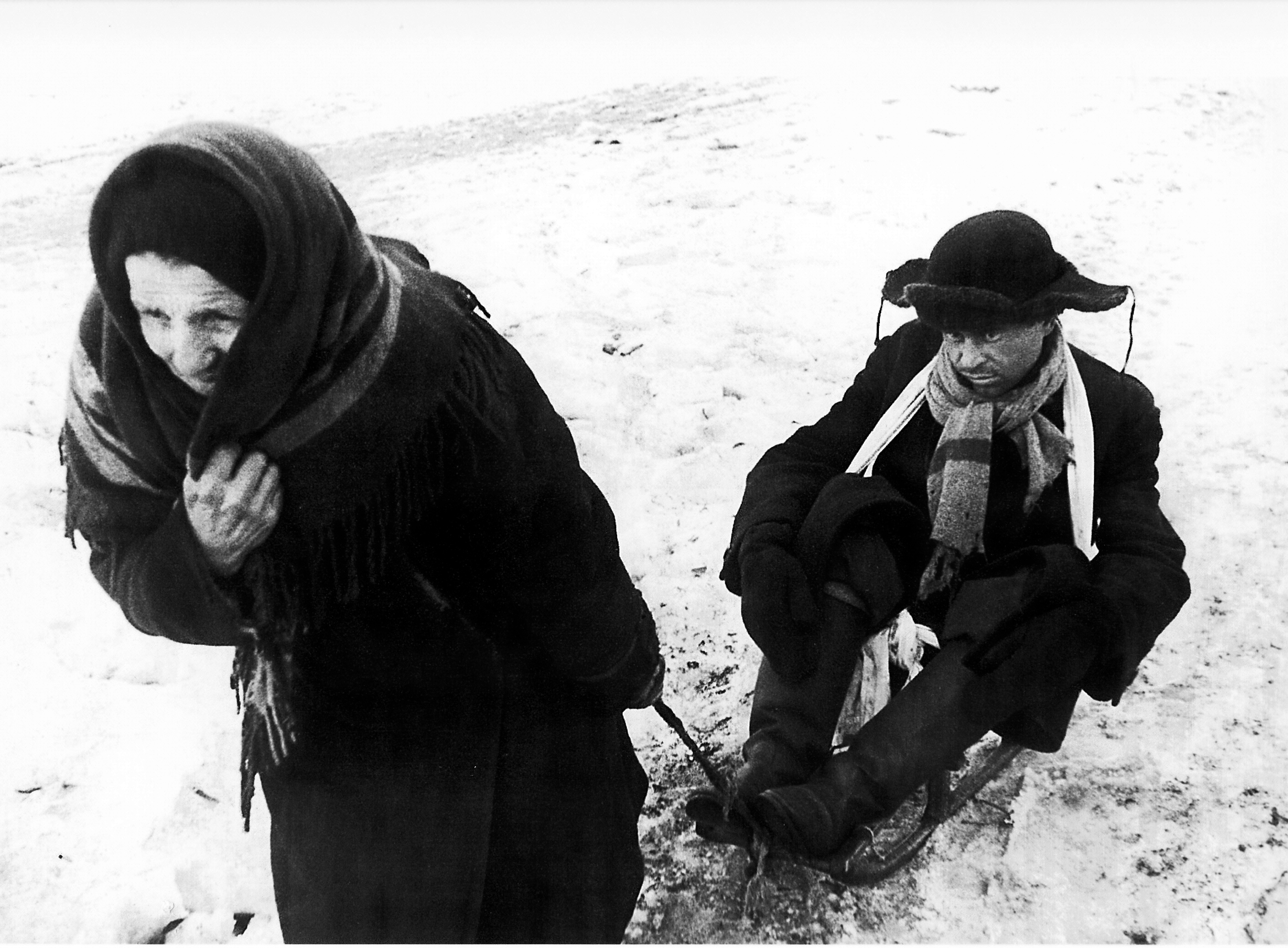
"Hungry people." A grandmother carries a hungry teenager on a sled during the Siege of Leningrad, February 1, 1942.

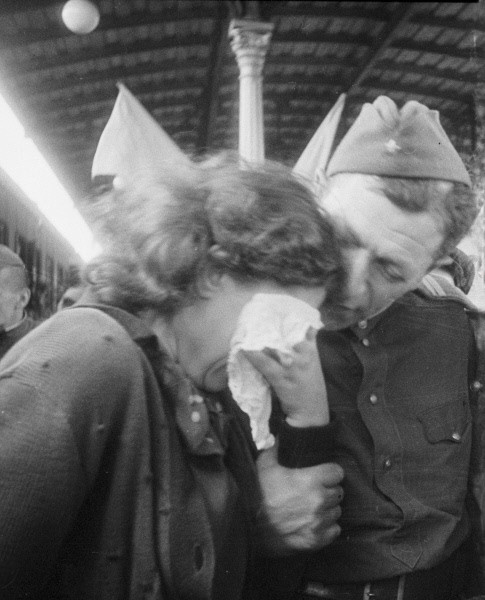
"Tears of happiness". A woman is happy that a soldier has returned alive. Moscow, June 1, 1945.

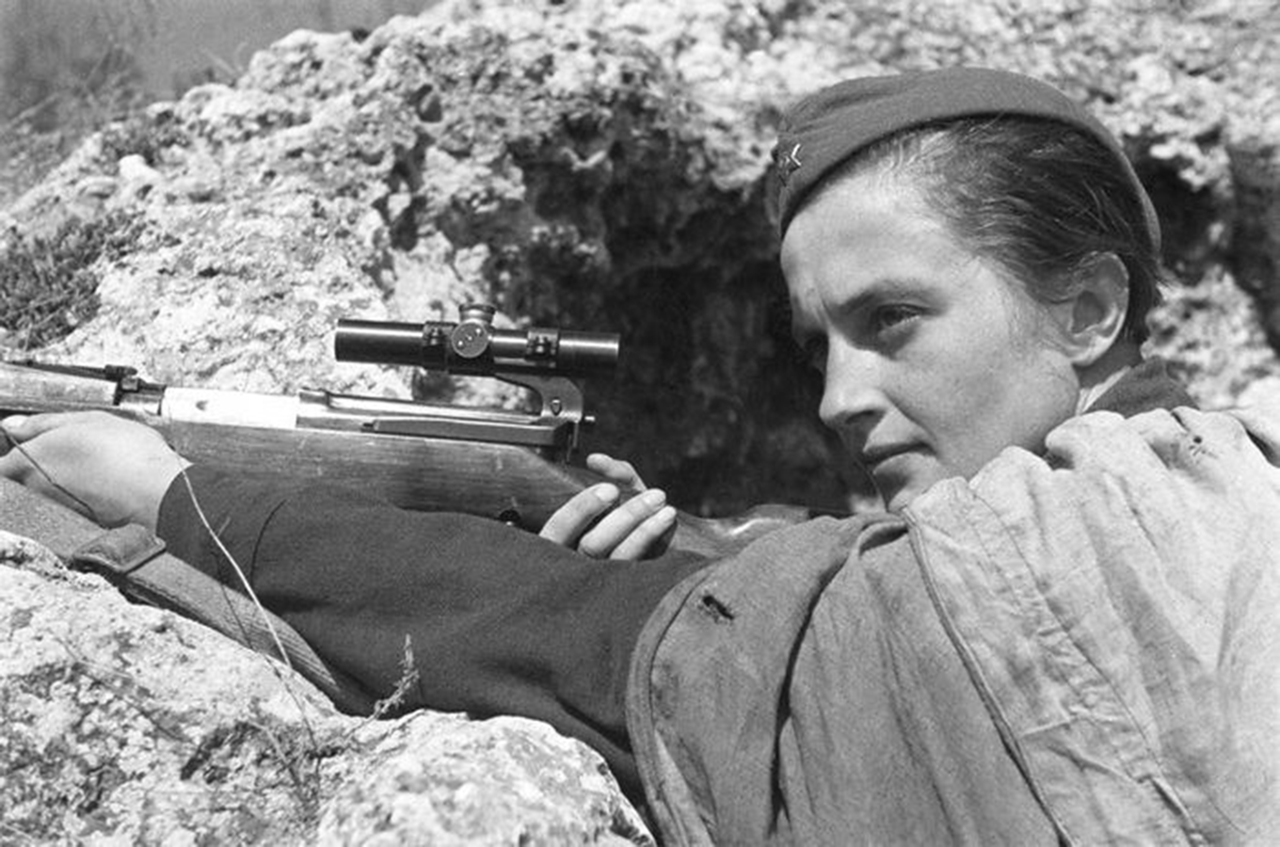
Lyudmila Pavlichenko, the most successful Soviet sniper with a weapon in a trench, 1942, Směna magazine, No. 12, 1942

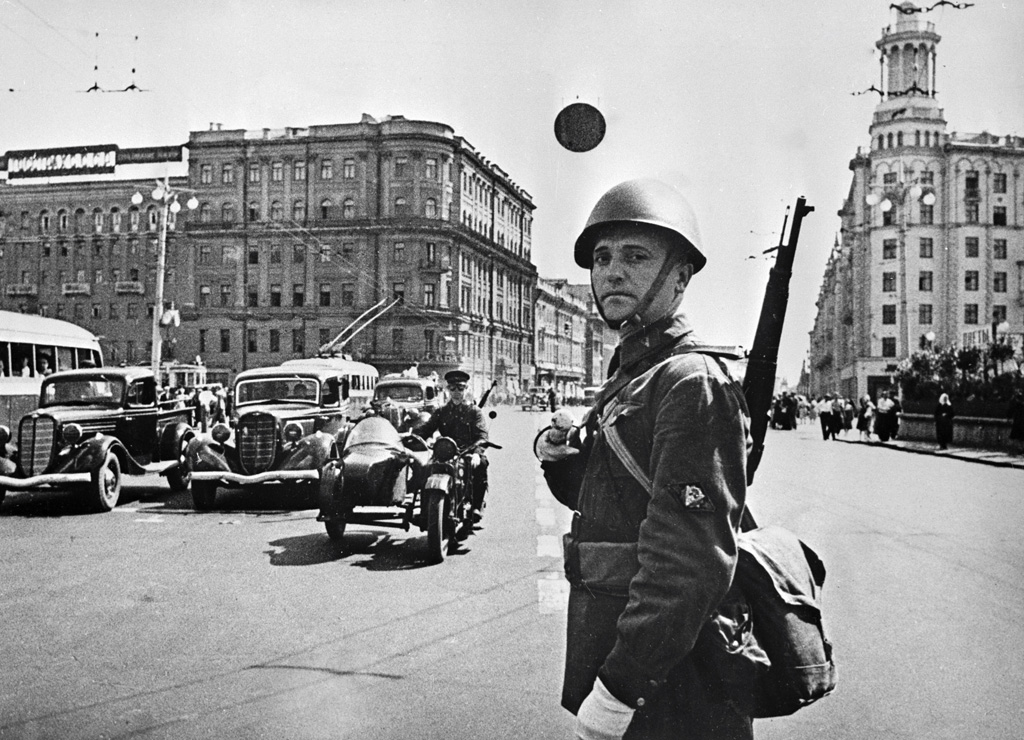
Militsiya officer at a post on Gorky Street, Moscow, August 1941.

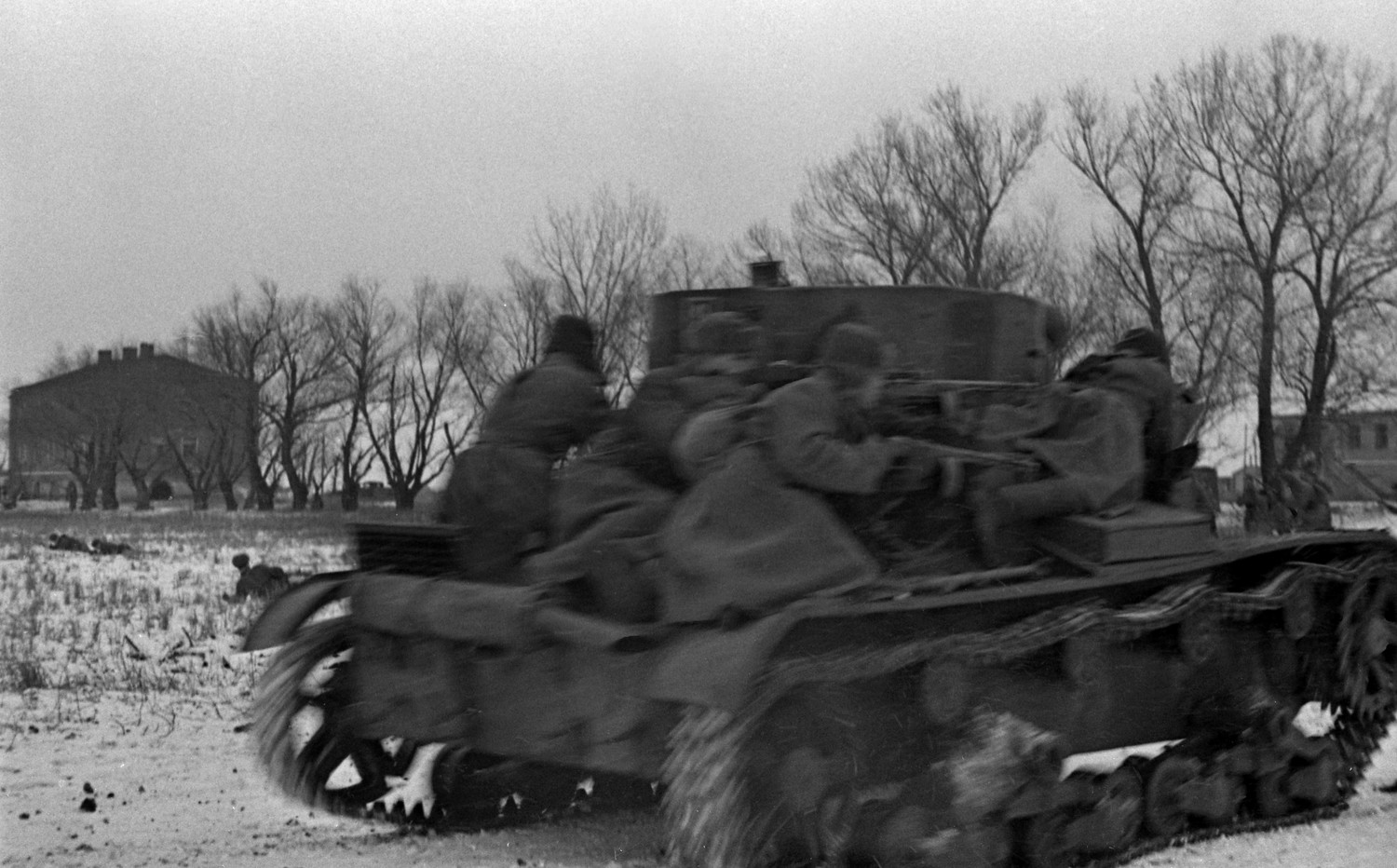
"Tank landing with a T-26 near Rostov in the Korsun-Shevchenkovsky region." The Great Patriotic War 1941-1945. Winter 1944.
